

485001–485100 

|-bgcolor=#fefefe
| 485001 ||  || — || October 25, 2009 || Kitt Peak || Spacewatch || — || align=right data-sort-value="0.79" | 790 m || 
|-id=002 bgcolor=#fefefe
| 485002 ||  || — || November 11, 2009 || Hibiscus || N. Teamo || — || align=right data-sort-value="0.90" | 900 m || 
|-id=003 bgcolor=#fefefe
| 485003 ||  || — || April 12, 2004 || Kitt Peak || Spacewatch || — || align=right data-sort-value="0.59" | 590 m || 
|-id=004 bgcolor=#d6d6d6
| 485004 ||  || — || November 10, 2009 || Kitt Peak || Spacewatch || — || align=right | 4.1 km || 
|-id=005 bgcolor=#fefefe
| 485005 ||  || — || October 18, 2009 || La Sagra || OAM Obs. || — || align=right data-sort-value="0.76" | 760 m || 
|-id=006 bgcolor=#d6d6d6
| 485006 ||  || — || November 9, 2009 || Kitt Peak || Spacewatch || — || align=right | 4.2 km || 
|-id=007 bgcolor=#d6d6d6
| 485007 ||  || — || November 11, 2009 || Kitt Peak || Spacewatch || — || align=right | 3.3 km || 
|-id=008 bgcolor=#d6d6d6
| 485008 ||  || — || November 13, 2009 || La Sagra || OAM Obs. || — || align=right | 4.4 km || 
|-id=009 bgcolor=#fefefe
| 485009 ||  || — || November 11, 2009 || Mount Lemmon || Mount Lemmon Survey || — || align=right data-sort-value="0.65" | 650 m || 
|-id=010 bgcolor=#fefefe
| 485010 ||  || — || November 10, 2009 || Mount Lemmon || Mount Lemmon Survey || — || align=right data-sort-value="0.78" | 780 m || 
|-id=011 bgcolor=#fefefe
| 485011 ||  || — || November 18, 2009 || Socorro || LINEAR || — || align=right | 1.6 km || 
|-id=012 bgcolor=#fefefe
| 485012 ||  || — || November 16, 2009 || Mount Lemmon || Mount Lemmon Survey || — || align=right data-sort-value="0.57" | 570 m || 
|-id=013 bgcolor=#fefefe
| 485013 ||  || — || November 17, 2009 || Mount Lemmon || Mount Lemmon Survey || — || align=right data-sort-value="0.54" | 540 m || 
|-id=014 bgcolor=#fefefe
| 485014 ||  || — || November 16, 2009 || Kitt Peak || Spacewatch || — || align=right data-sort-value="0.68" | 680 m || 
|-id=015 bgcolor=#d6d6d6
| 485015 ||  || — || October 14, 2009 || Mount Lemmon || Mount Lemmon Survey || — || align=right | 4.0 km || 
|-id=016 bgcolor=#fefefe
| 485016 ||  || — || November 17, 2009 || Kitt Peak || Spacewatch || — || align=right data-sort-value="0.59" | 590 m || 
|-id=017 bgcolor=#fefefe
| 485017 ||  || — || October 20, 2009 || Socorro || LINEAR || — || align=right data-sort-value="0.82" | 820 m || 
|-id=018 bgcolor=#d6d6d6
| 485018 ||  || — || November 8, 2009 || Kitt Peak || Spacewatch || — || align=right | 2.5 km || 
|-id=019 bgcolor=#d6d6d6
| 485019 ||  || — || September 24, 2009 || Mount Lemmon || Mount Lemmon Survey || — || align=right | 2.8 km || 
|-id=020 bgcolor=#fefefe
| 485020 ||  || — || November 18, 2009 || Kitt Peak || Spacewatch || — || align=right data-sort-value="0.65" | 650 m || 
|-id=021 bgcolor=#fefefe
| 485021 ||  || — || November 18, 2009 || Kitt Peak || Spacewatch || — || align=right data-sort-value="0.75" | 750 m || 
|-id=022 bgcolor=#d6d6d6
| 485022 ||  || — || November 11, 2009 || Kitt Peak || Spacewatch || — || align=right | 3.1 km || 
|-id=023 bgcolor=#d6d6d6
| 485023 ||  || — || November 19, 2009 || Kitt Peak || Spacewatch || — || align=right | 3.0 km || 
|-id=024 bgcolor=#fefefe
| 485024 ||  || — || November 11, 2009 || Kitt Peak || Spacewatch || — || align=right data-sort-value="0.55" | 550 m || 
|-id=025 bgcolor=#d6d6d6
| 485025 ||  || — || November 19, 2009 || Kitt Peak || Spacewatch || — || align=right | 3.2 km || 
|-id=026 bgcolor=#d6d6d6
| 485026 ||  || — || September 28, 2003 || Anderson Mesa || LONEOS || — || align=right | 3.6 km || 
|-id=027 bgcolor=#d6d6d6
| 485027 ||  || — || November 19, 2009 || Mount Lemmon || Mount Lemmon Survey || — || align=right | 3.0 km || 
|-id=028 bgcolor=#d6d6d6
| 485028 ||  || — || September 21, 2009 || Mount Lemmon || Mount Lemmon Survey || — || align=right | 2.4 km || 
|-id=029 bgcolor=#d6d6d6
| 485029 ||  || — || October 15, 2009 || Kitt Peak || Spacewatch || — || align=right | 3.2 km || 
|-id=030 bgcolor=#d6d6d6
| 485030 ||  || — || September 22, 2009 || Mount Lemmon || Mount Lemmon Survey || — || align=right | 4.1 km || 
|-id=031 bgcolor=#d6d6d6
| 485031 ||  || — || November 18, 2009 || La Sagra || OAM Obs. || URS || align=right | 4.2 km || 
|-id=032 bgcolor=#d6d6d6
| 485032 ||  || — || November 18, 2009 || La Sagra || OAM Obs. || — || align=right | 4.3 km || 
|-id=033 bgcolor=#d6d6d6
| 485033 ||  || — || November 8, 2009 || Kitt Peak || Spacewatch || — || align=right | 3.1 km || 
|-id=034 bgcolor=#d6d6d6
| 485034 ||  || — || October 14, 2009 || Mount Lemmon || Mount Lemmon Survey || — || align=right | 3.2 km || 
|-id=035 bgcolor=#fefefe
| 485035 ||  || — || November 18, 2009 || Kitt Peak || Spacewatch || — || align=right data-sort-value="0.71" | 710 m || 
|-id=036 bgcolor=#d6d6d6
| 485036 ||  || — || August 28, 2009 || La Sagra || OAM Obs. || — || align=right | 3.2 km || 
|-id=037 bgcolor=#fefefe
| 485037 ||  || — || December 18, 2009 || Kitt Peak || Spacewatch || — || align=right data-sort-value="0.62" | 620 m || 
|-id=038 bgcolor=#fefefe
| 485038 ||  || — || December 18, 2009 || Mount Lemmon || Mount Lemmon Survey || — || align=right | 1.5 km || 
|-id=039 bgcolor=#fefefe
| 485039 ||  || — || January 6, 2010 || Kitt Peak || Spacewatch || — || align=right data-sort-value="0.59" | 590 m || 
|-id=040 bgcolor=#fefefe
| 485040 ||  || — || January 6, 2010 || Kitt Peak || Spacewatch || — || align=right data-sort-value="0.85" | 850 m || 
|-id=041 bgcolor=#fefefe
| 485041 ||  || — || February 14, 2007 || Lulin || Lulin Obs. || (2076) || align=right data-sort-value="0.99" | 990 m || 
|-id=042 bgcolor=#fefefe
| 485042 ||  || — || December 17, 2009 || Kitt Peak || Spacewatch || — || align=right data-sort-value="0.65" | 650 m || 
|-id=043 bgcolor=#fefefe
| 485043 ||  || — || January 8, 2010 || Kitt Peak || Spacewatch || — || align=right data-sort-value="0.65" | 650 m || 
|-id=044 bgcolor=#fefefe
| 485044 ||  || — || January 15, 2010 || Faulkes Telescope || M. Micheli || critical || align=right data-sort-value="0.65" | 650 m || 
|-id=045 bgcolor=#fefefe
| 485045 ||  || — || January 8, 2010 || Mount Lemmon || Mount Lemmon Survey || — || align=right data-sort-value="0.64" | 640 m || 
|-id=046 bgcolor=#fefefe
| 485046 ||  || — || January 7, 2010 || WISE || WISE || — || align=right data-sort-value="0.85" | 850 m || 
|-id=047 bgcolor=#fefefe
| 485047 ||  || — || January 23, 2010 || Bisei SG Center || BATTeRS || — || align=right data-sort-value="0.75" | 750 m || 
|-id=048 bgcolor=#d6d6d6
| 485048 ||  || — || January 12, 2010 || WISE || WISE || — || align=right | 5.3 km || 
|-id=049 bgcolor=#fefefe
| 485049 ||  || — || February 9, 2010 || Mount Lemmon || Mount Lemmon Survey || — || align=right data-sort-value="0.62" | 620 m || 
|-id=050 bgcolor=#fefefe
| 485050 ||  || — || February 9, 2010 || Mount Lemmon || Mount Lemmon Survey || — || align=right | 1.1 km || 
|-id=051 bgcolor=#FFC2E0
| 485051 ||  || — || February 13, 2010 || Socorro || LINEAR || AMO || align=right data-sort-value="0.50" | 500 m || 
|-id=052 bgcolor=#fefefe
| 485052 ||  || — || February 13, 2010 || Mount Lemmon || Mount Lemmon Survey || — || align=right data-sort-value="0.78" | 780 m || 
|-id=053 bgcolor=#fefefe
| 485053 ||  || — || February 14, 2010 || Mount Lemmon || Mount Lemmon Survey || — || align=right | 1.8 km || 
|-id=054 bgcolor=#fefefe
| 485054 ||  || — || January 8, 2010 || Kitt Peak || Spacewatch || — || align=right data-sort-value="0.69" | 690 m || 
|-id=055 bgcolor=#fefefe
| 485055 ||  || — || February 14, 2010 || Mount Lemmon || Mount Lemmon Survey || — || align=right | 2.0 km || 
|-id=056 bgcolor=#fefefe
| 485056 ||  || — || July 19, 2007 || Siding Spring || SSS || — || align=right | 1.1 km || 
|-id=057 bgcolor=#fefefe
| 485057 ||  || — || February 15, 2010 || Haleakala || Pan-STARRS || — || align=right data-sort-value="0.68" | 680 m || 
|-id=058 bgcolor=#fefefe
| 485058 ||  || — || January 10, 2010 || Kitt Peak || Spacewatch || — || align=right data-sort-value="0.72" | 720 m || 
|-id=059 bgcolor=#fefefe
| 485059 ||  || — || February 16, 2010 || Kitt Peak || Spacewatch || — || align=right data-sort-value="0.77" | 770 m || 
|-id=060 bgcolor=#fefefe
| 485060 ||  || — || February 16, 2010 || Kitt Peak || Spacewatch || — || align=right | 1.2 km || 
|-id=061 bgcolor=#fefefe
| 485061 ||  || — || February 16, 2010 || Kitt Peak || Spacewatch || — || align=right | 1.7 km || 
|-id=062 bgcolor=#fefefe
| 485062 ||  || — || February 17, 2010 || Kitt Peak || Spacewatch || — || align=right data-sort-value="0.62" | 620 m || 
|-id=063 bgcolor=#fefefe
| 485063 ||  || — || February 21, 2010 || WISE || WISE || — || align=right | 1.8 km || 
|-id=064 bgcolor=#fefefe
| 485064 ||  || — || January 16, 2010 || Catalina || CSS || — || align=right | 1.5 km || 
|-id=065 bgcolor=#fefefe
| 485065 ||  || — || March 9, 2010 || Taunus || E. Schwab, R. Kling || NYS || align=right data-sort-value="0.68" | 680 m || 
|-id=066 bgcolor=#fefefe
| 485066 ||  || — || March 9, 2010 || La Sagra || OAM Obs. || — || align=right data-sort-value="0.93" | 930 m || 
|-id=067 bgcolor=#fefefe
| 485067 ||  || — || March 30, 2003 || Anderson Mesa || LONEOS || — || align=right data-sort-value="0.78" | 780 m || 
|-id=068 bgcolor=#fefefe
| 485068 ||  || — || March 10, 2010 || La Sagra || OAM Obs. || — || align=right data-sort-value="0.69" | 690 m || 
|-id=069 bgcolor=#fefefe
| 485069 ||  || — || March 11, 2010 || La Sagra || OAM Obs. || — || align=right data-sort-value="0.75" | 750 m || 
|-id=070 bgcolor=#fefefe
| 485070 ||  || — || March 5, 2010 || Kitt Peak || Spacewatch || BAP || align=right data-sort-value="0.77" | 770 m || 
|-id=071 bgcolor=#fefefe
| 485071 ||  || — || March 13, 2010 || Catalina || CSS || — || align=right | 1.7 km || 
|-id=072 bgcolor=#fefefe
| 485072 ||  || — || March 12, 2010 || Mount Lemmon || Mount Lemmon Survey || ERI || align=right | 1.3 km || 
|-id=073 bgcolor=#d6d6d6
| 485073 ||  || — || September 30, 2005 || Mount Lemmon || Mount Lemmon Survey || 3:2 || align=right | 4.2 km || 
|-id=074 bgcolor=#fefefe
| 485074 ||  || — || March 14, 2010 || La Sagra || OAM Obs. || — || align=right data-sort-value="0.78" | 780 m || 
|-id=075 bgcolor=#fefefe
| 485075 ||  || — || February 17, 2010 || Kitt Peak || Spacewatch || — || align=right data-sort-value="0.71" | 710 m || 
|-id=076 bgcolor=#fefefe
| 485076 ||  || — || March 14, 2010 || Kitt Peak || Spacewatch || — || align=right data-sort-value="0.75" | 750 m || 
|-id=077 bgcolor=#fefefe
| 485077 ||  || — || March 4, 2010 || Kitt Peak || Spacewatch || critical || align=right data-sort-value="0.54" | 540 m || 
|-id=078 bgcolor=#fefefe
| 485078 ||  || — || June 1, 2000 || Kitt Peak || Spacewatch || — || align=right data-sort-value="0.50" | 500 m || 
|-id=079 bgcolor=#fefefe
| 485079 ||  || — || March 13, 2010 || Kitt Peak || Spacewatch || NYS || align=right data-sort-value="0.63" | 630 m || 
|-id=080 bgcolor=#fefefe
| 485080 ||  || — || November 29, 2005 || Kitt Peak || Spacewatch || — || align=right data-sort-value="0.62" | 620 m || 
|-id=081 bgcolor=#fefefe
| 485081 ||  || — || October 28, 2008 || Kitt Peak || Spacewatch || — || align=right data-sort-value="0.97" | 970 m || 
|-id=082 bgcolor=#fefefe
| 485082 ||  || — || March 12, 2010 || Kitt Peak || Spacewatch || — || align=right data-sort-value="0.63" | 630 m || 
|-id=083 bgcolor=#fefefe
| 485083 ||  || — || March 13, 2010 || Kitt Peak || Spacewatch || MAS || align=right data-sort-value="0.64" | 640 m || 
|-id=084 bgcolor=#fefefe
| 485084 ||  || — || March 14, 2010 || Kitt Peak || Spacewatch || — || align=right data-sort-value="0.75" | 750 m || 
|-id=085 bgcolor=#fefefe
| 485085 ||  || — || March 15, 2010 || Mount Lemmon || Mount Lemmon Survey || — || align=right data-sort-value="0.94" | 940 m || 
|-id=086 bgcolor=#fefefe
| 485086 ||  || — || March 13, 2010 || La Sagra || OAM Obs. || — || align=right | 1.1 km || 
|-id=087 bgcolor=#fefefe
| 485087 ||  || — || February 2, 2006 || Kitt Peak || Spacewatch || MAS || align=right data-sort-value="0.71" | 710 m || 
|-id=088 bgcolor=#fefefe
| 485088 ||  || — || December 25, 2009 || Kitt Peak || Spacewatch || (5026) || align=right | 2.2 km || 
|-id=089 bgcolor=#fefefe
| 485089 ||  || — || March 17, 2010 || Kitt Peak || Spacewatch || — || align=right | 1.8 km || 
|-id=090 bgcolor=#fefefe
| 485090 ||  || — || February 16, 2010 || Mount Lemmon || Mount Lemmon Survey || — || align=right data-sort-value="0.68" | 680 m || 
|-id=091 bgcolor=#fefefe
| 485091 ||  || — || October 26, 2008 || Kitt Peak || Spacewatch || — || align=right data-sort-value="0.78" | 780 m || 
|-id=092 bgcolor=#fefefe
| 485092 ||  || — || February 18, 2010 || Mount Lemmon || Mount Lemmon Survey || — || align=right data-sort-value="0.90" | 900 m || 
|-id=093 bgcolor=#fefefe
| 485093 ||  || — || March 20, 2010 || Kitt Peak || Spacewatch || — || align=right data-sort-value="0.89" | 890 m || 
|-id=094 bgcolor=#fefefe
| 485094 ||  || — || January 26, 2006 || Mount Lemmon || Mount Lemmon Survey || — || align=right data-sort-value="0.72" | 720 m || 
|-id=095 bgcolor=#fefefe
| 485095 ||  || — || February 21, 2006 || Mount Lemmon || Mount Lemmon Survey || MAS || align=right data-sort-value="0.59" | 590 m || 
|-id=096 bgcolor=#fefefe
| 485096 ||  || — || December 27, 2005 || Kitt Peak || Spacewatch || NYS || align=right data-sort-value="0.55" | 550 m || 
|-id=097 bgcolor=#E9E9E9
| 485097 ||  || — || April 7, 2010 || La Sagra || OAM Obs. || — || align=right | 2.3 km || 
|-id=098 bgcolor=#C2FFFF
| 485098 ||  || — || April 7, 2010 || WISE || WISE || L5 || align=right | 12 km || 
|-id=099 bgcolor=#fefefe
| 485099 ||  || — || April 6, 2010 || Catalina || CSS || — || align=right data-sort-value="0.91" | 910 m || 
|-id=100 bgcolor=#fefefe
| 485100 ||  || — || April 6, 2010 || Kitt Peak || Spacewatch || — || align=right data-sort-value="0.89" | 890 m || 
|}

485101–485200 

|-bgcolor=#fefefe
| 485101 ||  || — || April 4, 2010 || Kitt Peak || Spacewatch || — || align=right data-sort-value="0.72" | 720 m || 
|-id=102 bgcolor=#fefefe
| 485102 ||  || — || January 19, 2010 || WISE || WISE || — || align=right | 1.7 km || 
|-id=103 bgcolor=#fefefe
| 485103 ||  || — || January 21, 2010 || WISE || WISE || — || align=right | 1.5 km || 
|-id=104 bgcolor=#fefefe
| 485104 ||  || — || April 11, 2010 || Kitt Peak || Spacewatch || — || align=right data-sort-value="0.65" | 650 m || 
|-id=105 bgcolor=#fefefe
| 485105 ||  || — || April 7, 2010 || Kitt Peak || Spacewatch || — || align=right data-sort-value="0.60" | 600 m || 
|-id=106 bgcolor=#E9E9E9
| 485106 ||  || — || April 10, 2010 || Mount Lemmon || Mount Lemmon Survey || — || align=right | 2.3 km || 
|-id=107 bgcolor=#fefefe
| 485107 ||  || — || April 29, 2003 || Kitt Peak || Spacewatch || — || align=right data-sort-value="0.78" | 780 m || 
|-id=108 bgcolor=#E9E9E9
| 485108 ||  || — || April 18, 2010 || WISE || WISE || — || align=right | 3.2 km || 
|-id=109 bgcolor=#fefefe
| 485109 ||  || — || April 25, 2010 || Kitt Peak || Spacewatch || — || align=right data-sort-value="0.67" | 670 m || 
|-id=110 bgcolor=#FFC2E0
| 485110 ||  || — || April 25, 2010 || WISE || WISE || APOcritical || align=right data-sort-value="0.36" | 360 m || 
|-id=111 bgcolor=#fefefe
| 485111 ||  || — || April 19, 2010 || WISE || WISE || — || align=right | 2.0 km || 
|-id=112 bgcolor=#fefefe
| 485112 ||  || — || January 16, 2010 || WISE || WISE || ERI || align=right | 1.8 km || 
|-id=113 bgcolor=#fefefe
| 485113 ||  || — || May 7, 2010 || Kitt Peak || Spacewatch || MAS || align=right data-sort-value="0.70" | 700 m || 
|-id=114 bgcolor=#fefefe
| 485114 ||  || — || February 25, 2006 || Kitt Peak || Spacewatch || — || align=right data-sort-value="0.82" | 820 m || 
|-id=115 bgcolor=#fefefe
| 485115 ||  || — || May 11, 2010 || Mount Lemmon || Mount Lemmon Survey || — || align=right data-sort-value="0.59" | 590 m || 
|-id=116 bgcolor=#FA8072
| 485116 ||  || — || April 20, 2010 || Siding Spring || SSS || — || align=right data-sort-value="0.84" | 840 m || 
|-id=117 bgcolor=#fefefe
| 485117 ||  || — || April 14, 2010 || Kitt Peak || Spacewatch || — || align=right data-sort-value="0.84" | 840 m || 
|-id=118 bgcolor=#d6d6d6
| 485118 ||  || — || May 18, 2010 || Kitt Peak || Spacewatch || — || align=right | 4.0 km || 
|-id=119 bgcolor=#E9E9E9
| 485119 ||  || — || May 20, 2010 || WISE || WISE || — || align=right | 1.8 km || 
|-id=120 bgcolor=#E9E9E9
| 485120 ||  || — || May 30, 2010 || WISE || WISE || — || align=right | 2.0 km || 
|-id=121 bgcolor=#E9E9E9
| 485121 ||  || — || May 31, 2010 || WISE || WISE || — || align=right | 2.6 km || 
|-id=122 bgcolor=#E9E9E9
| 485122 ||  || — || June 2, 2010 || WISE || WISE || — || align=right | 3.0 km || 
|-id=123 bgcolor=#E9E9E9
| 485123 ||  || — || June 13, 2010 || WISE || WISE || — || align=right | 2.8 km || 
|-id=124 bgcolor=#fefefe
| 485124 ||  || — || April 25, 2006 || Mount Lemmon || Mount Lemmon Survey || MAS || align=right data-sort-value="0.62" | 620 m || 
|-id=125 bgcolor=#E9E9E9
| 485125 ||  || — || March 13, 2010 || WISE || WISE || — || align=right | 2.1 km || 
|-id=126 bgcolor=#d6d6d6
| 485126 ||  || — || June 23, 2010 || WISE || WISE || — || align=right | 4.8 km || 
|-id=127 bgcolor=#d6d6d6
| 485127 ||  || — || June 16, 2010 || WISE || WISE || — || align=right | 3.0 km || 
|-id=128 bgcolor=#d6d6d6
| 485128 ||  || — || June 24, 2010 || WISE || WISE || — || align=right | 3.0 km || 
|-id=129 bgcolor=#E9E9E9
| 485129 ||  || — || May 8, 2005 || Mount Lemmon || Mount Lemmon Survey || — || align=right | 2.9 km || 
|-id=130 bgcolor=#d6d6d6
| 485130 ||  || — || June 28, 2010 || WISE || WISE || — || align=right | 4.1 km || 
|-id=131 bgcolor=#d6d6d6
| 485131 ||  || — || June 29, 2010 || WISE || WISE || — || align=right | 2.5 km || 
|-id=132 bgcolor=#fefefe
| 485132 ||  || — || July 12, 2010 || La Sagra || OAM Obs. || H || align=right data-sort-value="0.90" | 900 m || 
|-id=133 bgcolor=#E9E9E9
| 485133 ||  || — || June 17, 2010 || Mount Lemmon || Mount Lemmon Survey || — || align=right | 2.7 km || 
|-id=134 bgcolor=#E9E9E9
| 485134 ||  || — || July 2, 2010 || WISE || WISE || — || align=right | 3.4 km || 
|-id=135 bgcolor=#d6d6d6
| 485135 ||  || — || July 14, 2010 || WISE || WISE || — || align=right | 4.7 km || 
|-id=136 bgcolor=#d6d6d6
| 485136 ||  || — || December 10, 2005 || Kitt Peak || Spacewatch || — || align=right | 1.7 km || 
|-id=137 bgcolor=#d6d6d6
| 485137 ||  || — || July 15, 2010 || WISE || WISE || — || align=right | 2.2 km || 
|-id=138 bgcolor=#d6d6d6
| 485138 ||  || — || July 16, 2010 || La Sagra || OAM Obs. || — || align=right | 3.4 km || 
|-id=139 bgcolor=#E9E9E9
| 485139 ||  || — || January 31, 2009 || Mount Lemmon || Mount Lemmon Survey || — || align=right | 2.5 km || 
|-id=140 bgcolor=#d6d6d6
| 485140 ||  || — || July 18, 2010 || WISE || WISE || — || align=right | 3.3 km || 
|-id=141 bgcolor=#d6d6d6
| 485141 ||  || — || October 27, 2005 || Mount Lemmon || Mount Lemmon Survey || — || align=right | 2.9 km || 
|-id=142 bgcolor=#d6d6d6
| 485142 ||  || — || July 19, 2010 || WISE || WISE || — || align=right | 1.9 km || 
|-id=143 bgcolor=#d6d6d6
| 485143 ||  || — || July 24, 2010 || WISE || WISE || LIX || align=right | 3.2 km || 
|-id=144 bgcolor=#d6d6d6
| 485144 ||  || — || July 28, 2010 || WISE || WISE || — || align=right | 2.4 km || 
|-id=145 bgcolor=#fefefe
| 485145 ||  || — || July 20, 2010 || La Sagra || OAM Obs. || — || align=right | 1.0 km || 
|-id=146 bgcolor=#d6d6d6
| 485146 ||  || — || December 24, 2005 || Kitt Peak || Spacewatch || — || align=right | 2.5 km || 
|-id=147 bgcolor=#E9E9E9
| 485147 ||  || — || July 16, 2010 || La Sagra || OAM Obs. || — || align=right | 2.2 km || 
|-id=148 bgcolor=#d6d6d6
| 485148 ||  || — || August 7, 2010 || WISE || WISE || — || align=right | 2.2 km || 
|-id=149 bgcolor=#E9E9E9
| 485149 ||  || — || January 13, 2008 || Kitt Peak || Spacewatch || — || align=right | 2.5 km || 
|-id=150 bgcolor=#E9E9E9
| 485150 ||  || — || June 21, 2010 || Mount Lemmon || Mount Lemmon Survey || — || align=right | 1.8 km || 
|-id=151 bgcolor=#fefefe
| 485151 ||  || — || August 5, 2010 || La Sagra || OAM Obs. || H || align=right data-sort-value="0.81" | 810 m || 
|-id=152 bgcolor=#fefefe
| 485152 ||  || — || August 12, 2010 || Andrushivka || Andrushivka Obs. || H || align=right data-sort-value="0.91" | 910 m || 
|-id=153 bgcolor=#fefefe
| 485153 ||  || — || December 29, 2008 || Mount Lemmon || Mount Lemmon Survey || H || align=right data-sort-value="0.71" | 710 m || 
|-id=154 bgcolor=#E9E9E9
| 485154 ||  || — || September 2, 2010 || Mount Lemmon || Mount Lemmon Survey || — || align=right | 1.8 km || 
|-id=155 bgcolor=#E9E9E9
| 485155 ||  || — || September 3, 2010 || Socorro || LINEAR || — || align=right | 1.7 km || 
|-id=156 bgcolor=#E9E9E9
| 485156 ||  || — || October 20, 2006 || Mount Lemmon || Mount Lemmon Survey || HOF || align=right | 2.2 km || 
|-id=157 bgcolor=#fefefe
| 485157 ||  || — || August 16, 2010 || La Sagra || OAM Obs. || H || align=right data-sort-value="0.55" | 550 m || 
|-id=158 bgcolor=#fefefe
| 485158 ||  || — || September 3, 2010 || Socorro || LINEAR || H || align=right data-sort-value="0.67" | 670 m || 
|-id=159 bgcolor=#fefefe
| 485159 ||  || — || September 4, 2010 || Kitt Peak || Spacewatch || H || align=right data-sort-value="0.79" | 790 m || 
|-id=160 bgcolor=#d6d6d6
| 485160 ||  || — || November 5, 2005 || Mount Lemmon || Mount Lemmon Survey || — || align=right | 2.1 km || 
|-id=161 bgcolor=#d6d6d6
| 485161 ||  || — || September 7, 2010 || La Sagra || OAM Obs. || — || align=right | 2.7 km || 
|-id=162 bgcolor=#d6d6d6
| 485162 ||  || — || September 6, 2010 || La Sagra || OAM Obs. || — || align=right | 2.6 km || 
|-id=163 bgcolor=#fefefe
| 485163 ||  || — || October 9, 1997 || Xinglong || SCAP || H || align=right data-sort-value="0.80" | 800 m || 
|-id=164 bgcolor=#d6d6d6
| 485164 ||  || — || September 10, 2010 || Kitt Peak || Spacewatch || — || align=right | 2.2 km || 
|-id=165 bgcolor=#E9E9E9
| 485165 ||  || — || September 10, 2010 || Kitt Peak || Spacewatch || — || align=right | 1.8 km || 
|-id=166 bgcolor=#d6d6d6
| 485166 ||  || — || August 31, 2005 || Kitt Peak || Spacewatch || KOR || align=right | 1.2 km || 
|-id=167 bgcolor=#E9E9E9
| 485167 ||  || — || September 11, 2010 || Kitt Peak || Spacewatch || MRX || align=right data-sort-value="0.97" | 970 m || 
|-id=168 bgcolor=#d6d6d6
| 485168 ||  || — || September 7, 2010 || La Sagra || OAM Obs. || — || align=right | 2.2 km || 
|-id=169 bgcolor=#d6d6d6
| 485169 ||  || — || September 14, 2010 || Kitt Peak || Spacewatch || — || align=right | 2.9 km || 
|-id=170 bgcolor=#E9E9E9
| 485170 ||  || — || September 10, 2010 || Kitt Peak || Spacewatch || EUN || align=right | 1.3 km || 
|-id=171 bgcolor=#E9E9E9
| 485171 ||  || — || September 10, 2010 || La Sagra || OAM Obs. || — || align=right | 1.7 km || 
|-id=172 bgcolor=#d6d6d6
| 485172 ||  || — || September 6, 2010 || La Sagra || OAM Obs. || — || align=right | 3.0 km || 
|-id=173 bgcolor=#E9E9E9
| 485173 ||  || — || September 11, 2010 || Kitt Peak || Spacewatch || WIT || align=right data-sort-value="0.90" | 900 m || 
|-id=174 bgcolor=#E9E9E9
| 485174 ||  || — || September 14, 2010 || Kitt Peak || Spacewatch || — || align=right | 1.8 km || 
|-id=175 bgcolor=#E9E9E9
| 485175 ||  || — || September 10, 2010 || Mount Lemmon || Mount Lemmon Survey || — || align=right | 1.7 km || 
|-id=176 bgcolor=#E9E9E9
| 485176 ||  || — || September 17, 2010 || Mount Lemmon || Mount Lemmon Survey || — || align=right | 1.8 km || 
|-id=177 bgcolor=#d6d6d6
| 485177 ||  || — || September 5, 2010 || La Sagra || OAM Obs. || — || align=right | 3.2 km || 
|-id=178 bgcolor=#E9E9E9
| 485178 ||  || — || September 12, 2010 || Kitt Peak || Spacewatch || GEF || align=right | 1.2 km || 
|-id=179 bgcolor=#fefefe
| 485179 ||  || — || September 30, 2010 || La Sagra || OAM Obs. || H || align=right data-sort-value="0.72" | 720 m || 
|-id=180 bgcolor=#fefefe
| 485180 ||  || — || April 1, 2009 || Mount Lemmon || Mount Lemmon Survey || H || align=right data-sort-value="0.47" | 470 m || 
|-id=181 bgcolor=#fefefe
| 485181 ||  || — || September 10, 2010 || Catalina || CSS || H || align=right data-sort-value="0.67" | 670 m || 
|-id=182 bgcolor=#E9E9E9
| 485182 ||  || — || September 10, 2010 || Catalina || CSS || — || align=right | 2.3 km || 
|-id=183 bgcolor=#E9E9E9
| 485183 ||  || — || October 1, 2010 || Kitt Peak || Spacewatch || — || align=right | 1.9 km || 
|-id=184 bgcolor=#E9E9E9
| 485184 ||  || — || October 8, 2010 || La Sagra || OAM Obs. || — || align=right | 3.0 km || 
|-id=185 bgcolor=#E9E9E9
| 485185 ||  || — || February 28, 2008 || Mount Lemmon || Mount Lemmon Survey || AGN || align=right | 1.0 km || 
|-id=186 bgcolor=#d6d6d6
| 485186 ||  || — || September 14, 2010 || Kitt Peak || Spacewatch || — || align=right | 1.8 km || 
|-id=187 bgcolor=#fefefe
| 485187 ||  || — || September 15, 2010 || Kitt Peak || Spacewatch || H || align=right data-sort-value="0.51" | 510 m || 
|-id=188 bgcolor=#d6d6d6
| 485188 ||  || — || September 10, 2010 || Kitt Peak || Spacewatch || KOR || align=right | 1.2 km || 
|-id=189 bgcolor=#d6d6d6
| 485189 ||  || — || October 27, 2005 || Mount Lemmon || Mount Lemmon Survey || — || align=right | 1.6 km || 
|-id=190 bgcolor=#d6d6d6
| 485190 ||  || — || April 27, 2008 || Kitt Peak || Spacewatch || — || align=right | 2.7 km || 
|-id=191 bgcolor=#d6d6d6
| 485191 ||  || — || October 8, 2010 || Kitt Peak || Spacewatch || critical || align=right | 2.1 km || 
|-id=192 bgcolor=#E9E9E9
| 485192 ||  || — || October 1, 2010 || Mount Lemmon || Mount Lemmon Survey || — || align=right | 1.7 km || 
|-id=193 bgcolor=#d6d6d6
| 485193 ||  || — || October 1, 2010 || Mount Lemmon || Mount Lemmon Survey || — || align=right | 1.8 km || 
|-id=194 bgcolor=#E9E9E9
| 485194 ||  || — || October 10, 2010 || Mount Lemmon || Mount Lemmon Survey || HOF || align=right | 2.5 km || 
|-id=195 bgcolor=#E9E9E9
| 485195 ||  || — || September 18, 2010 || Mount Lemmon || Mount Lemmon Survey || — || align=right | 1.5 km || 
|-id=196 bgcolor=#E9E9E9
| 485196 ||  || — || September 28, 2010 || Kitt Peak || Spacewatch || — || align=right | 2.0 km || 
|-id=197 bgcolor=#d6d6d6
| 485197 ||  || — || September 29, 2010 || Mount Lemmon || Mount Lemmon Survey || TEL || align=right | 1.2 km || 
|-id=198 bgcolor=#d6d6d6
| 485198 ||  || — || October 10, 2010 || Socorro || LINEAR || — || align=right | 3.7 km || 
|-id=199 bgcolor=#d6d6d6
| 485199 ||  || — || November 5, 1994 || Kitt Peak || Spacewatch || — || align=right | 2.4 km || 
|-id=200 bgcolor=#d6d6d6
| 485200 ||  || — || September 16, 2010 || Mount Lemmon || Mount Lemmon Survey || — || align=right | 3.1 km || 
|}

485201–485300 

|-bgcolor=#d6d6d6
| 485201 ||  || — || March 13, 2007 || Mount Lemmon || Mount Lemmon Survey || — || align=right | 2.9 km || 
|-id=202 bgcolor=#d6d6d6
| 485202 ||  || — || October 12, 2010 || Mount Lemmon || Mount Lemmon Survey || EOS || align=right | 1.5 km || 
|-id=203 bgcolor=#d6d6d6
| 485203 ||  || — || October 29, 2010 || Mount Lemmon || Mount Lemmon Survey || TEL || align=right | 1.5 km || 
|-id=204 bgcolor=#d6d6d6
| 485204 ||  || — || December 1, 2005 || Kitt Peak || Spacewatch || — || align=right | 3.2 km || 
|-id=205 bgcolor=#d6d6d6
| 485205 ||  || — || October 29, 2010 || Kitt Peak || Spacewatch || — || align=right | 2.2 km || 
|-id=206 bgcolor=#d6d6d6
| 485206 ||  || — || October 29, 2010 || Kitt Peak || Spacewatch || — || align=right | 3.1 km || 
|-id=207 bgcolor=#d6d6d6
| 485207 ||  || — || October 29, 2010 || Mount Lemmon || Mount Lemmon Survey || URS || align=right | 2.9 km || 
|-id=208 bgcolor=#d6d6d6
| 485208 ||  || — || November 29, 2005 || Kitt Peak || Spacewatch || — || align=right | 2.7 km || 
|-id=209 bgcolor=#E9E9E9
| 485209 ||  || — || August 6, 2010 || WISE || WISE || — || align=right | 2.6 km || 
|-id=210 bgcolor=#d6d6d6
| 485210 ||  || — || October 13, 2010 || Mount Lemmon || Mount Lemmon Survey || — || align=right | 2.2 km || 
|-id=211 bgcolor=#d6d6d6
| 485211 ||  || — || October 30, 2010 || Mount Lemmon || Mount Lemmon Survey || — || align=right | 2.4 km || 
|-id=212 bgcolor=#d6d6d6
| 485212 ||  || — || October 30, 2010 || Mount Lemmon || Mount Lemmon Survey || — || align=right | 1.9 km || 
|-id=213 bgcolor=#E9E9E9
| 485213 ||  || — || October 29, 2010 || Mount Lemmon || Mount Lemmon Survey || WIT || align=right data-sort-value="0.96" | 960 m || 
|-id=214 bgcolor=#d6d6d6
| 485214 ||  || — || October 19, 2010 || Mount Lemmon || Mount Lemmon Survey || critical || align=right | 1.9 km || 
|-id=215 bgcolor=#d6d6d6
| 485215 ||  || — || October 30, 2010 || Catalina || CSS || — || align=right | 2.8 km || 
|-id=216 bgcolor=#d6d6d6
| 485216 ||  || — || December 21, 2005 || Catalina || CSS || — || align=right | 2.5 km || 
|-id=217 bgcolor=#d6d6d6
| 485217 ||  || — || October 28, 2010 || Mount Lemmon || Mount Lemmon Survey || — || align=right | 2.5 km || 
|-id=218 bgcolor=#E9E9E9
| 485218 ||  || — || October 17, 2010 || Catalina || CSS || GEF || align=right | 1.2 km || 
|-id=219 bgcolor=#d6d6d6
| 485219 ||  || — || September 30, 2010 || La Sagra || OAM Obs. || fast? || align=right | 3.6 km || 
|-id=220 bgcolor=#C2FFFF
| 485220 ||  || — || May 12, 2010 || WISE || WISE || L5 || align=right | 12 km || 
|-id=221 bgcolor=#d6d6d6
| 485221 ||  || — || November 3, 2010 || Kitt Peak || Spacewatch || Tj (2.98) || align=right | 3.7 km || 
|-id=222 bgcolor=#d6d6d6
| 485222 ||  || — || December 1, 2005 || Kitt Peak || Spacewatch || — || align=right | 1.9 km || 
|-id=223 bgcolor=#d6d6d6
| 485223 ||  || — || October 12, 2010 || Mount Lemmon || Mount Lemmon Survey || EOS || align=right | 1.6 km || 
|-id=224 bgcolor=#E9E9E9
| 485224 ||  || — || November 2, 2010 || Mount Lemmon || Mount Lemmon Survey || — || align=right | 1.9 km || 
|-id=225 bgcolor=#d6d6d6
| 485225 ||  || — || August 8, 2010 || WISE || WISE || — || align=right | 2.8 km || 
|-id=226 bgcolor=#d6d6d6
| 485226 ||  || — || October 28, 2010 || Kitt Peak || Spacewatch || — || align=right | 2.4 km || 
|-id=227 bgcolor=#d6d6d6
| 485227 ||  || — || October 27, 2005 || Mount Lemmon || Mount Lemmon Survey || — || align=right | 2.2 km || 
|-id=228 bgcolor=#d6d6d6
| 485228 ||  || — || November 1, 2010 || Kitt Peak || Spacewatch || EOS || align=right | 1.9 km || 
|-id=229 bgcolor=#d6d6d6
| 485229 ||  || — || September 17, 2010 || Mount Lemmon || Mount Lemmon Survey || — || align=right | 2.1 km || 
|-id=230 bgcolor=#d6d6d6
| 485230 ||  || — || November 4, 2010 || La Sagra || OAM Obs. || — || align=right | 2.9 km || 
|-id=231 bgcolor=#E9E9E9
| 485231 ||  || — || September 18, 2010 || Mount Lemmon || Mount Lemmon Survey || — || align=right | 1.5 km || 
|-id=232 bgcolor=#d6d6d6
| 485232 ||  || — || November 2, 2010 || Kitt Peak || Spacewatch || EOS || align=right | 1.6 km || 
|-id=233 bgcolor=#E9E9E9
| 485233 ||  || — || February 29, 2008 || Kitt Peak || Spacewatch || — || align=right | 1.7 km || 
|-id=234 bgcolor=#d6d6d6
| 485234 ||  || — || October 29, 2005 || Mount Lemmon || Mount Lemmon Survey || — || align=right | 2.0 km || 
|-id=235 bgcolor=#d6d6d6
| 485235 ||  || — || November 4, 2010 || La Sagra || OAM Obs. || — || align=right | 3.1 km || 
|-id=236 bgcolor=#fefefe
| 485236 ||  || — || October 29, 2010 || Catalina || CSS || H || align=right data-sort-value="0.94" | 940 m || 
|-id=237 bgcolor=#d6d6d6
| 485237 ||  || — || October 29, 2010 || Kitt Peak || Spacewatch || — || align=right | 2.4 km || 
|-id=238 bgcolor=#d6d6d6
| 485238 ||  || — || September 18, 2010 || Mount Lemmon || Mount Lemmon Survey || — || align=right | 2.8 km || 
|-id=239 bgcolor=#fefefe
| 485239 ||  || — || November 14, 1999 || Socorro || LINEAR || H || align=right data-sort-value="0.70" | 700 m || 
|-id=240 bgcolor=#d6d6d6
| 485240 ||  || — || July 27, 2010 || WISE || WISE || — || align=right | 3.0 km || 
|-id=241 bgcolor=#d6d6d6
| 485241 ||  || — || December 30, 2005 || Kitt Peak || Spacewatch || critical || align=right | 2.1 km || 
|-id=242 bgcolor=#d6d6d6
| 485242 ||  || — || October 29, 2010 || Kitt Peak || Spacewatch || EOS || align=right | 2.0 km || 
|-id=243 bgcolor=#d6d6d6
| 485243 ||  || — || October 29, 2010 || Kitt Peak || Spacewatch || — || align=right | 2.4 km || 
|-id=244 bgcolor=#E9E9E9
| 485244 ||  || — || November 6, 2010 || Kitt Peak || Spacewatch ||  || align=right | 2.7 km || 
|-id=245 bgcolor=#d6d6d6
| 485245 ||  || — || September 11, 2010 || Mount Lemmon || Mount Lemmon Survey || — || align=right | 2.7 km || 
|-id=246 bgcolor=#d6d6d6
| 485246 ||  || — || November 7, 2010 || Kitt Peak || Spacewatch || HYG || align=right | 2.2 km || 
|-id=247 bgcolor=#d6d6d6
| 485247 ||  || — || October 30, 2010 || Kitt Peak || Spacewatch || — || align=right | 3.0 km || 
|-id=248 bgcolor=#d6d6d6
| 485248 ||  || — || November 12, 2005 || Kitt Peak || Spacewatch || — || align=right | 2.9 km || 
|-id=249 bgcolor=#d6d6d6
| 485249 ||  || — || September 11, 2010 || Mount Lemmon || Mount Lemmon Survey || HYG || align=right | 2.3 km || 
|-id=250 bgcolor=#d6d6d6
| 485250 ||  || — || November 10, 2010 || Kitt Peak || Spacewatch || Tj (2.96) || align=right | 4.8 km || 
|-id=251 bgcolor=#d6d6d6
| 485251 ||  || — || November 8, 2010 || Kitt Peak || Spacewatch || — || align=right | 2.0 km || 
|-id=252 bgcolor=#d6d6d6
| 485252 ||  || — || November 6, 2005 || Mount Lemmon || Mount Lemmon Survey || — || align=right | 2.5 km || 
|-id=253 bgcolor=#d6d6d6
| 485253 ||  || — || October 29, 2010 || Mount Lemmon || Mount Lemmon Survey || — || align=right | 2.1 km || 
|-id=254 bgcolor=#d6d6d6
| 485254 ||  || — || November 30, 2005 || Kitt Peak || Spacewatch || EOS || align=right | 1.5 km || 
|-id=255 bgcolor=#d6d6d6
| 485255 ||  || — || November 10, 2010 || Kitt Peak || Spacewatch || — || align=right | 2.5 km || 
|-id=256 bgcolor=#d6d6d6
| 485256 ||  || — || September 3, 2010 || Mount Lemmon || Mount Lemmon Survey || — || align=right | 2.5 km || 
|-id=257 bgcolor=#E9E9E9
| 485257 ||  || — || September 11, 2010 || Mount Lemmon || Mount Lemmon Survey || — || align=right | 2.4 km || 
|-id=258 bgcolor=#d6d6d6
| 485258 ||  || — || November 1, 2010 || Kitt Peak || Spacewatch || 615 || align=right | 1.2 km || 
|-id=259 bgcolor=#d6d6d6
| 485259 ||  || — || October 9, 2004 || Kitt Peak || Spacewatch || Tj (2.98) || align=right | 3.8 km || 
|-id=260 bgcolor=#d6d6d6
| 485260 ||  || — || October 29, 2010 || Mount Lemmon || Mount Lemmon Survey || — || align=right | 2.8 km || 
|-id=261 bgcolor=#d6d6d6
| 485261 ||  || — || March 14, 2007 || Kitt Peak || Spacewatch || — || align=right | 2.5 km || 
|-id=262 bgcolor=#d6d6d6
| 485262 ||  || — || September 16, 2010 || Mount Lemmon || Mount Lemmon Survey || — || align=right | 2.1 km || 
|-id=263 bgcolor=#d6d6d6
| 485263 ||  || — || November 29, 2005 || Mount Lemmon || Mount Lemmon Survey || — || align=right | 2.0 km || 
|-id=264 bgcolor=#d6d6d6
| 485264 ||  || — || October 14, 2010 || Mount Lemmon || Mount Lemmon Survey || — || align=right | 2.3 km || 
|-id=265 bgcolor=#d6d6d6
| 485265 ||  || — || November 14, 2010 || Mount Lemmon || Mount Lemmon Survey || — || align=right | 2.4 km || 
|-id=266 bgcolor=#d6d6d6
| 485266 ||  || — || November 16, 2010 || Mount Lemmon || Mount Lemmon Survey || — || align=right | 2.1 km || 
|-id=267 bgcolor=#d6d6d6
| 485267 ||  || — || September 5, 2010 || Mount Lemmon || Mount Lemmon Survey || — || align=right | 1.9 km || 
|-id=268 bgcolor=#d6d6d6
| 485268 ||  || — || November 8, 2010 || Kitt Peak || Spacewatch || — || align=right | 2.9 km || 
|-id=269 bgcolor=#d6d6d6
| 485269 ||  || — || January 5, 2006 || Kitt Peak || Spacewatch || — || align=right | 1.9 km || 
|-id=270 bgcolor=#d6d6d6
| 485270 ||  || — || November 6, 1999 || Kitt Peak || Spacewatch || EOS || align=right | 1.8 km || 
|-id=271 bgcolor=#d6d6d6
| 485271 ||  || — || November 5, 2010 || Mount Lemmon || Mount Lemmon Survey || — || align=right | 3.0 km || 
|-id=272 bgcolor=#d6d6d6
| 485272 ||  || — || April 14, 2008 || Mount Lemmon || Mount Lemmon Survey || — || align=right | 2.7 km || 
|-id=273 bgcolor=#d6d6d6
| 485273 ||  || — || November 13, 2010 || Kitt Peak || Spacewatch || — || align=right | 1.8 km || 
|-id=274 bgcolor=#d6d6d6
| 485274 ||  || — || December 30, 2005 || Kitt Peak || Spacewatch || — || align=right | 2.1 km || 
|-id=275 bgcolor=#d6d6d6
| 485275 ||  || — || January 8, 2006 || Mount Lemmon || Mount Lemmon Survey || — || align=right | 1.9 km || 
|-id=276 bgcolor=#d6d6d6
| 485276 ||  || — || October 8, 2004 || Kitt Peak || Spacewatch || — || align=right | 2.4 km || 
|-id=277 bgcolor=#d6d6d6
| 485277 ||  || — || October 31, 2010 || Kitt Peak || Spacewatch || — || align=right | 2.8 km || 
|-id=278 bgcolor=#E9E9E9
| 485278 ||  || — || December 18, 2001 || Socorro || LINEAR || — || align=right | 3.3 km || 
|-id=279 bgcolor=#d6d6d6
| 485279 ||  || — || November 5, 2010 || Mount Lemmon || Mount Lemmon Survey || — || align=right | 3.0 km || 
|-id=280 bgcolor=#d6d6d6
| 485280 ||  || — || December 8, 2010 || Mount Lemmon || Mount Lemmon Survey || — || align=right | 3.5 km || 
|-id=281 bgcolor=#d6d6d6
| 485281 ||  || — || January 4, 2006 || Kitt Peak || Spacewatch || — || align=right | 2.1 km || 
|-id=282 bgcolor=#d6d6d6
| 485282 ||  || — || September 15, 2009 || Mount Lemmon || Mount Lemmon Survey || EOS || align=right | 1.8 km || 
|-id=283 bgcolor=#d6d6d6
| 485283 ||  || — || November 13, 2010 || Kitt Peak || Spacewatch || EOS || align=right | 1.8 km || 
|-id=284 bgcolor=#d6d6d6
| 485284 ||  || — || October 9, 2010 || Kitt Peak || Spacewatch || — || align=right | 4.3 km || 
|-id=285 bgcolor=#d6d6d6
| 485285 ||  || — || November 11, 2004 || Catalina || CSS || Tj (2.95) || align=right | 3.5 km || 
|-id=286 bgcolor=#d6d6d6
| 485286 ||  || — || December 29, 2010 || Catalina || CSS || — || align=right | 2.6 km || 
|-id=287 bgcolor=#d6d6d6
| 485287 ||  || — || December 9, 2010 || Mount Lemmon || Mount Lemmon Survey || TIR || align=right | 3.0 km || 
|-id=288 bgcolor=#d6d6d6
| 485288 ||  || — || January 2, 2011 || Mayhill-ISON || ISON || — || align=right | 3.1 km || 
|-id=289 bgcolor=#d6d6d6
| 485289 ||  || — || December 3, 2010 || Mount Lemmon || Mount Lemmon Survey || — || align=right | 2.4 km || 
|-id=290 bgcolor=#d6d6d6
| 485290 ||  || — || November 1, 2010 || Mount Lemmon || Mount Lemmon Survey || — || align=right | 3.0 km || 
|-id=291 bgcolor=#d6d6d6
| 485291 ||  || — || January 5, 2011 || Catalina || CSS || — || align=right | 2.8 km || 
|-id=292 bgcolor=#d6d6d6
| 485292 ||  || — || November 15, 2010 || Mount Lemmon || Mount Lemmon Survey || Tj (2.97) || align=right | 3.3 km || 
|-id=293 bgcolor=#d6d6d6
| 485293 ||  || — || December 10, 2010 || Mount Lemmon || Mount Lemmon Survey || — || align=right | 2.8 km || 
|-id=294 bgcolor=#d6d6d6
| 485294 ||  || — || August 16, 2009 || Kitt Peak || Spacewatch || — || align=right | 2.6 km || 
|-id=295 bgcolor=#d6d6d6
| 485295 ||  || — || December 4, 2010 || Pla D'Arguines || Pla D'Arguines Obs. || — || align=right | 3.4 km || 
|-id=296 bgcolor=#d6d6d6
| 485296 ||  || — || December 8, 2010 || Mount Lemmon || Mount Lemmon Survey || — || align=right | 2.6 km || 
|-id=297 bgcolor=#d6d6d6
| 485297 ||  || — || January 10, 2011 || Kitt Peak || Spacewatch || — || align=right | 2.3 km || 
|-id=298 bgcolor=#d6d6d6
| 485298 ||  || — || December 8, 2010 || Mount Lemmon || Mount Lemmon Survey || — || align=right | 3.3 km || 
|-id=299 bgcolor=#d6d6d6
| 485299 ||  || — || December 3, 2010 || Mount Lemmon || Mount Lemmon Survey || — || align=right | 2.7 km || 
|-id=300 bgcolor=#d6d6d6
| 485300 ||  || — || February 3, 2000 || Kitt Peak || Spacewatch || — || align=right | 2.3 km || 
|}

485301–485400 

|-bgcolor=#d6d6d6
| 485301 ||  || — || January 13, 2011 || Mount Lemmon || Mount Lemmon Survey || HYG || align=right | 2.5 km || 
|-id=302 bgcolor=#d6d6d6
| 485302 ||  || — || November 19, 2009 || La Sagra || OAM Obs. || — || align=right | 3.4 km || 
|-id=303 bgcolor=#d6d6d6
| 485303 ||  || — || January 3, 2011 || Mount Lemmon || Mount Lemmon Survey || critical || align=right | 2.2 km || 
|-id=304 bgcolor=#fefefe
| 485304 ||  || — || January 11, 2011 || Kitt Peak || Spacewatch || H || align=right data-sort-value="0.91" | 910 m || 
|-id=305 bgcolor=#d6d6d6
| 485305 ||  || — || July 28, 2008 || Mount Lemmon || Mount Lemmon Survey || EOS || align=right | 2.0 km || 
|-id=306 bgcolor=#d6d6d6
| 485306 ||  || — || January 25, 2010 || WISE || WISE || — || align=right | 3.8 km || 
|-id=307 bgcolor=#d6d6d6
| 485307 ||  || — || January 3, 2011 || Mount Lemmon || Mount Lemmon Survey || — || align=right | 2.3 km || 
|-id=308 bgcolor=#d6d6d6
| 485308 ||  || — || December 10, 2010 || Mount Lemmon || Mount Lemmon Survey || — || align=right | 2.5 km || 
|-id=309 bgcolor=#d6d6d6
| 485309 ||  || — || January 13, 2011 || Mount Lemmon || Mount Lemmon Survey || — || align=right | 2.8 km || 
|-id=310 bgcolor=#d6d6d6
| 485310 ||  || — || January 14, 2011 || Mount Lemmon || Mount Lemmon Survey || EOS || align=right | 1.4 km || 
|-id=311 bgcolor=#d6d6d6
| 485311 ||  || — || December 14, 2010 || Mount Lemmon || Mount Lemmon Survey || — || align=right | 3.4 km || 
|-id=312 bgcolor=#d6d6d6
| 485312 ||  || — || July 27, 2009 || Kitt Peak || Spacewatch || — || align=right | 2.0 km || 
|-id=313 bgcolor=#d6d6d6
| 485313 ||  || — || January 8, 2000 || Kitt Peak || Spacewatch || — || align=right | 2.4 km || 
|-id=314 bgcolor=#d6d6d6
| 485314 ||  || — || December 13, 2010 || Mount Lemmon || Mount Lemmon Survey || HYG || align=right | 2.1 km || 
|-id=315 bgcolor=#d6d6d6
| 485315 ||  || — || January 25, 2011 || Kitt Peak || Spacewatch || — || align=right | 2.6 km || 
|-id=316 bgcolor=#d6d6d6
| 485316 ||  || — || January 30, 2000 || Kitt Peak || Spacewatch || — || align=right | 2.6 km || 
|-id=317 bgcolor=#d6d6d6
| 485317 ||  || — || January 26, 2011 || Mount Lemmon || Mount Lemmon Survey || — || align=right | 2.8 km || 
|-id=318 bgcolor=#d6d6d6
| 485318 ||  || — || January 27, 2011 || Mount Lemmon || Mount Lemmon Survey || — || align=right | 2.7 km || 
|-id=319 bgcolor=#d6d6d6
| 485319 ||  || — || December 13, 2010 || Mount Lemmon || Mount Lemmon Survey || — || align=right | 2.0 km || 
|-id=320 bgcolor=#d6d6d6
| 485320 ||  || — || January 30, 2011 || Haleakala || Pan-STARRS || — || align=right | 3.5 km || 
|-id=321 bgcolor=#d6d6d6
| 485321 ||  || — || February 4, 2000 || Kitt Peak || Spacewatch || THM || align=right | 1.6 km || 
|-id=322 bgcolor=#d6d6d6
| 485322 ||  || — || December 5, 2010 || Mount Lemmon || Mount Lemmon Survey || EOS || align=right | 1.9 km || 
|-id=323 bgcolor=#d6d6d6
| 485323 ||  || — || January 30, 2011 || Mount Lemmon || Mount Lemmon Survey || LIX || align=right | 2.9 km || 
|-id=324 bgcolor=#d6d6d6
| 485324 ||  || — || January 16, 2011 || Mount Lemmon || Mount Lemmon Survey || TRE || align=right | 2.2 km || 
|-id=325 bgcolor=#d6d6d6
| 485325 ||  || — || January 10, 2011 || Mount Lemmon || Mount Lemmon Survey || — || align=right | 3.0 km || 
|-id=326 bgcolor=#d6d6d6
| 485326 ||  || — || January 8, 2011 || Mount Lemmon || Mount Lemmon Survey || — || align=right | 3.0 km || 
|-id=327 bgcolor=#d6d6d6
| 485327 ||  || — || January 29, 2011 || Kitt Peak || Spacewatch || — || align=right | 2.8 km || 
|-id=328 bgcolor=#d6d6d6
| 485328 ||  || — || January 11, 2011 || Kitt Peak || Spacewatch || — || align=right | 3.3 km || 
|-id=329 bgcolor=#d6d6d6
| 485329 ||  || — || December 5, 2010 || Mount Lemmon || Mount Lemmon Survey || — || align=right | 3.2 km || 
|-id=330 bgcolor=#d6d6d6
| 485330 ||  || — || January 28, 2011 || Mount Lemmon || Mount Lemmon Survey || — || align=right | 2.9 km || 
|-id=331 bgcolor=#d6d6d6
| 485331 ||  || — || January 29, 2010 || WISE || WISE || — || align=right | 2.8 km || 
|-id=332 bgcolor=#d6d6d6
| 485332 ||  || — || January 24, 2011 || Mount Lemmon || Mount Lemmon Survey || — || align=right | 2.5 km || 
|-id=333 bgcolor=#d6d6d6
| 485333 ||  || — || November 24, 2009 || Kitt Peak || Spacewatch || — || align=right | 2.5 km || 
|-id=334 bgcolor=#d6d6d6
| 485334 ||  || — || December 13, 2010 || Mount Lemmon || Mount Lemmon Survey || — || align=right | 3.9 km || 
|-id=335 bgcolor=#d6d6d6
| 485335 ||  || — || January 26, 2011 || Mount Lemmon || Mount Lemmon Survey || LIX || align=right | 3.0 km || 
|-id=336 bgcolor=#d6d6d6
| 485336 ||  || — || January 30, 2011 || Haleakala || Pan-STARRS || — || align=right | 3.0 km || 
|-id=337 bgcolor=#d6d6d6
| 485337 ||  || — || January 27, 2011 || Mount Lemmon || Mount Lemmon Survey || — || align=right | 2.6 km || 
|-id=338 bgcolor=#d6d6d6
| 485338 ||  || — || January 8, 2010 || WISE || WISE || — || align=right | 3.3 km || 
|-id=339 bgcolor=#d6d6d6
| 485339 ||  || — || May 2, 2001 || Haleakala || NEAT || — || align=right | 2.5 km || 
|-id=340 bgcolor=#d6d6d6
| 485340 ||  || — || September 30, 2003 || Kitt Peak || Spacewatch || — || align=right | 2.4 km || 
|-id=341 bgcolor=#d6d6d6
| 485341 ||  || — || January 30, 2011 || Haleakala || Pan-STARRS || — || align=right | 3.1 km || 
|-id=342 bgcolor=#d6d6d6
| 485342 ||  || — || January 30, 2011 || Haleakala || Pan-STARRS || — || align=right | 3.3 km || 
|-id=343 bgcolor=#d6d6d6
| 485343 ||  || — || December 9, 2010 || Mount Lemmon || Mount Lemmon Survey || EOS || align=right | 1.8 km || 
|-id=344 bgcolor=#d6d6d6
| 485344 ||  || — || January 27, 2011 || Mount Lemmon || Mount Lemmon Survey || — || align=right | 2.7 km || 
|-id=345 bgcolor=#d6d6d6
| 485345 ||  || — || January 28, 2011 || Mount Lemmon || Mount Lemmon Survey || Tj (2.95) || align=right | 3.6 km || 
|-id=346 bgcolor=#d6d6d6
| 485346 ||  || — || August 12, 2007 || Kitt Peak || Spacewatch || — || align=right | 2.7 km || 
|-id=347 bgcolor=#d6d6d6
| 485347 ||  || — || September 7, 2008 || Mount Lemmon || Mount Lemmon Survey || — || align=right | 3.1 km || 
|-id=348 bgcolor=#d6d6d6
| 485348 ||  || — || December 8, 2010 || Mount Lemmon || Mount Lemmon Survey || LIX || align=right | 3.0 km || 
|-id=349 bgcolor=#d6d6d6
| 485349 ||  || — || February 6, 2010 || WISE || WISE || — || align=right | 4.2 km || 
|-id=350 bgcolor=#d6d6d6
| 485350 ||  || — || December 8, 2010 || Mount Lemmon || Mount Lemmon Survey || — || align=right | 2.7 km || 
|-id=351 bgcolor=#d6d6d6
| 485351 ||  || — || January 28, 2011 || Mount Lemmon || Mount Lemmon Survey || — || align=right | 2.9 km || 
|-id=352 bgcolor=#d6d6d6
| 485352 ||  || — || January 28, 2011 || Mount Lemmon || Mount Lemmon Survey || — || align=right | 2.3 km || 
|-id=353 bgcolor=#d6d6d6
| 485353 ||  || — || February 5, 2010 || WISE || WISE || — || align=right | 3.2 km || 
|-id=354 bgcolor=#d6d6d6
| 485354 ||  || — || November 25, 2009 || Mount Lemmon || Mount Lemmon Survey || — || align=right | 2.9 km || 
|-id=355 bgcolor=#d6d6d6
| 485355 ||  || — || September 23, 2008 || Mount Lemmon || Mount Lemmon Survey || — || align=right | 2.2 km || 
|-id=356 bgcolor=#d6d6d6
| 485356 ||  || — || September 23, 2008 || Mount Lemmon || Mount Lemmon Survey || — || align=right | 3.7 km || 
|-id=357 bgcolor=#fefefe
| 485357 ||  || — || February 4, 2011 || Haleakala || Pan-STARRS || H || align=right | 1.2 km || 
|-id=358 bgcolor=#d6d6d6
| 485358 ||  || — || January 7, 2005 || Socorro || LINEAR || — || align=right | 2.7 km || 
|-id=359 bgcolor=#d6d6d6
| 485359 ||  || — || February 4, 2011 || Haleakala || Pan-STARRS || — || align=right | 3.6 km || 
|-id=360 bgcolor=#d6d6d6
| 485360 ||  || — || September 4, 2003 || Kitt Peak || Spacewatch || — || align=right | 2.7 km || 
|-id=361 bgcolor=#d6d6d6
| 485361 ||  || — || January 30, 2011 || Haleakala || Pan-STARRS || — || align=right | 3.1 km || 
|-id=362 bgcolor=#d6d6d6
| 485362 ||  || — || January 30, 2011 || Haleakala || Pan-STARRS || — || align=right | 2.9 km || 
|-id=363 bgcolor=#d6d6d6
| 485363 ||  || — || January 30, 2011 || Haleakala || Pan-STARRS || — || align=right | 2.9 km || 
|-id=364 bgcolor=#d6d6d6
| 485364 ||  || — || February 4, 2011 || Haleakala || Pan-STARRS || — || align=right | 2.8 km || 
|-id=365 bgcolor=#d6d6d6
| 485365 ||  || — || January 30, 2011 || Haleakala || Pan-STARRS || — || align=right | 2.9 km || 
|-id=366 bgcolor=#d6d6d6
| 485366 ||  || — || March 9, 2005 || Mount Lemmon || Mount Lemmon Survey || 7:4 || align=right | 2.8 km || 
|-id=367 bgcolor=#d6d6d6
| 485367 ||  || — || January 30, 2011 || Haleakala || Pan-STARRS || — || align=right | 3.0 km || 
|-id=368 bgcolor=#d6d6d6
| 485368 ||  || — || January 28, 2011 || Mount Lemmon || Mount Lemmon Survey || VER || align=right | 2.3 km || 
|-id=369 bgcolor=#d6d6d6
| 485369 ||  || — || January 30, 2011 || Haleakala || Pan-STARRS || THB || align=right | 2.2 km || 
|-id=370 bgcolor=#d6d6d6
| 485370 ||  || — || February 4, 2011 || Haleakala || Pan-STARRS || — || align=right | 3.4 km || 
|-id=371 bgcolor=#d6d6d6
| 485371 ||  || — || January 27, 2011 || Kitt Peak || Spacewatch || — || align=right | 2.8 km || 
|-id=372 bgcolor=#d6d6d6
| 485372 ||  || — || March 13, 2005 || Kitt Peak || Spacewatch || Tj (2.99) || align=right | 3.1 km || 
|-id=373 bgcolor=#d6d6d6
| 485373 ||  || — || March 24, 2006 || Mount Lemmon || Mount Lemmon Survey || — || align=right | 1.6 km || 
|-id=374 bgcolor=#d6d6d6
| 485374 ||  || — || January 16, 2005 || Kitt Peak || Spacewatch || — || align=right | 5.0 km || 
|-id=375 bgcolor=#d6d6d6
| 485375 ||  || — || January 8, 2011 || Catalina || CSS || — || align=right | 2.9 km || 
|-id=376 bgcolor=#d6d6d6
| 485376 ||  || — || January 31, 2006 || Kitt Peak || Spacewatch || — || align=right | 3.0 km || 
|-id=377 bgcolor=#d6d6d6
| 485377 ||  || — || February 17, 2010 || WISE || WISE || — || align=right | 3.4 km || 
|-id=378 bgcolor=#fefefe
| 485378 ||  || — || March 15, 2008 || Mount Lemmon || Mount Lemmon Survey || — || align=right data-sort-value="0.66" | 660 m || 
|-id=379 bgcolor=#FA8072
| 485379 ||  || — || July 8, 2005 || Kitt Peak || Spacewatch || — || align=right data-sort-value="0.56" | 560 m || 
|-id=380 bgcolor=#d6d6d6
| 485380 ||  || — || March 9, 2005 || Socorro || LINEAR || 7:4 || align=right | 3.5 km || 
|-id=381 bgcolor=#fefefe
| 485381 ||  || — || April 2, 2011 || Haleakala || Pan-STARRS || — || align=right data-sort-value="0.75" | 750 m || 
|-id=382 bgcolor=#fefefe
| 485382 ||  || — || January 16, 2011 || Mount Lemmon || Mount Lemmon Survey || — || align=right data-sort-value="0.97" | 970 m || 
|-id=383 bgcolor=#fefefe
| 485383 ||  || — || April 2, 2011 || Kitt Peak || Spacewatch || — || align=right data-sort-value="0.57" | 570 m || 
|-id=384 bgcolor=#fefefe
| 485384 ||  || — || April 1, 2011 || Kitt Peak || Spacewatch || — || align=right data-sort-value="0.46" | 460 m || 
|-id=385 bgcolor=#fefefe
| 485385 ||  || — || March 13, 2011 || Mount Lemmon || Mount Lemmon Survey || — || align=right data-sort-value="0.64" | 640 m || 
|-id=386 bgcolor=#fefefe
| 485386 ||  || — || April 27, 2011 || Haleakala || Pan-STARRS || — || align=right data-sort-value="0.68" | 680 m || 
|-id=387 bgcolor=#fefefe
| 485387 ||  || — || July 1, 2008 || Kitt Peak || Spacewatch || critical || align=right data-sort-value="0.71" | 710 m || 
|-id=388 bgcolor=#fefefe
| 485388 ||  || — || May 21, 2011 || Haleakala || Pan-STARRS || — || align=right data-sort-value="0.98" | 980 m || 
|-id=389 bgcolor=#fefefe
| 485389 ||  || — || May 21, 2011 || Haleakala || Pan-STARRS || — || align=right data-sort-value="0.73" | 730 m || 
|-id=390 bgcolor=#fefefe
| 485390 ||  || — || May 13, 2011 || Mount Lemmon || Mount Lemmon Survey || — || align=right data-sort-value="0.87" | 870 m || 
|-id=391 bgcolor=#fefefe
| 485391 ||  || — || May 24, 2011 || Mount Lemmon || Mount Lemmon Survey || — || align=right data-sort-value="0.65" | 650 m || 
|-id=392 bgcolor=#fefefe
| 485392 ||  || — || July 30, 2008 || Catalina || CSS || — || align=right data-sort-value="0.87" | 870 m || 
|-id=393 bgcolor=#d6d6d6
| 485393 ||  || — || May 30, 2011 || Haleakala || Pan-STARRS || 3:2 || align=right | 4.4 km || 
|-id=394 bgcolor=#fefefe
| 485394 ||  || — || April 30, 2011 || Mount Lemmon || Mount Lemmon Survey || — || align=right data-sort-value="0.52" | 520 m || 
|-id=395 bgcolor=#fefefe
| 485395 ||  || — || June 1, 2008 || Mount Lemmon || Mount Lemmon Survey || — || align=right data-sort-value="0.59" | 590 m || 
|-id=396 bgcolor=#C2FFFF
| 485396 ||  || — || June 3, 2011 || Mount Lemmon || Mount Lemmon Survey || L5 || align=right | 8.4 km || 
|-id=397 bgcolor=#E9E9E9
| 485397 ||  || — || May 28, 2011 || Mount Lemmon || Mount Lemmon Survey || — || align=right | 1.7 km || 
|-id=398 bgcolor=#E9E9E9
| 485398 ||  || — || December 31, 2007 || Mount Lemmon || Mount Lemmon Survey || — || align=right | 1.6 km || 
|-id=399 bgcolor=#fefefe
| 485399 ||  || — || June 23, 2011 || Kitt Peak || Spacewatch || — || align=right data-sort-value="0.98" | 980 m || 
|-id=400 bgcolor=#fefefe
| 485400 ||  || — || October 7, 2008 || Mount Lemmon || Mount Lemmon Survey || — || align=right data-sort-value="0.67" | 670 m || 
|}

485401–485500 

|-bgcolor=#fefefe
| 485401 ||  || — || May 14, 2011 || Mount Lemmon || Mount Lemmon Survey || — || align=right | 1.2 km || 
|-id=402 bgcolor=#fefefe
| 485402 ||  || — || July 5, 2011 || Haleakala || Pan-STARRS || — || align=right data-sort-value="0.97" | 970 m || 
|-id=403 bgcolor=#fefefe
| 485403 ||  || — || June 3, 2011 || Mount Lemmon || Mount Lemmon Survey || — || align=right data-sort-value="0.68" | 680 m || 
|-id=404 bgcolor=#fefefe
| 485404 ||  || — || July 22, 2011 || Haleakala || Pan-STARRS || — || align=right data-sort-value="0.87" | 870 m || 
|-id=405 bgcolor=#fefefe
| 485405 ||  || — || July 22, 2011 || Haleakala || Pan-STARRS || — || align=right data-sort-value="0.95" | 950 m || 
|-id=406 bgcolor=#fefefe
| 485406 ||  || — || June 12, 2011 || Mount Lemmon || Mount Lemmon Survey || — || align=right data-sort-value="0.86" | 860 m || 
|-id=407 bgcolor=#fefefe
| 485407 ||  || — || July 26, 2011 || Haleakala || Pan-STARRS || — || align=right data-sort-value="0.82" | 820 m || 
|-id=408 bgcolor=#fefefe
| 485408 ||  || — || July 26, 2011 || Haleakala || Pan-STARRS || MAS || align=right data-sort-value="0.79" | 790 m || 
|-id=409 bgcolor=#fefefe
| 485409 ||  || — || November 1, 2005 || Mount Lemmon || Mount Lemmon Survey || — || align=right data-sort-value="0.67" | 670 m || 
|-id=410 bgcolor=#fefefe
| 485410 ||  || — || July 28, 2011 || Haleakala || Pan-STARRS || — || align=right data-sort-value="0.86" | 860 m || 
|-id=411 bgcolor=#fefefe
| 485411 ||  || — || July 28, 2011 || Haleakala || Pan-STARRS || — || align=right data-sort-value="0.84" | 840 m || 
|-id=412 bgcolor=#C2FFFF
| 485412 ||  || — || July 27, 2011 || Haleakala || Pan-STARRS || L5 || align=right | 11 km || 
|-id=413 bgcolor=#C2FFFF
| 485413 ||  || — || July 22, 2011 || Haleakala || Pan-STARRS || L5 || align=right | 9.2 km || 
|-id=414 bgcolor=#C2FFFF
| 485414 ||  || — || December 18, 2004 || Mount Lemmon || Mount Lemmon Survey || L5 || align=right | 7.3 km || 
|-id=415 bgcolor=#C2FFFF
| 485415 ||  || — || September 23, 2014 || Haleakala || Pan-STARRS || L5 || align=right | 7.8 km || 
|-id=416 bgcolor=#C2FFFF
| 485416 ||  || — || January 26, 2006 || Mount Lemmon || Mount Lemmon Survey || L5 || align=right | 7.4 km || 
|-id=417 bgcolor=#C2FFFF
| 485417 ||  || — || July 27, 2011 || Haleakala || Pan-STARRS || L5 || align=right | 9.8 km || 
|-id=418 bgcolor=#C2FFFF
| 485418 ||  || — || July 28, 2011 || Haleakala || Pan-STARRS || L5 || align=right | 6.8 km || 
|-id=419 bgcolor=#fefefe
| 485419 ||  || — || July 31, 2011 || Haleakala || Pan-STARRS || — || align=right data-sort-value="0.79" | 790 m || 
|-id=420 bgcolor=#fefefe
| 485420 ||  || — || August 9, 2011 || Haleakala || Pan-STARRS || — || align=right data-sort-value="0.80" | 800 m || 
|-id=421 bgcolor=#C2FFFF
| 485421 ||  || — || August 18, 2011 || Haleakala || Pan-STARRS || L5 || align=right | 11 km || 
|-id=422 bgcolor=#C2FFFF
| 485422 ||  || — || August 2, 2011 || Haleakala || Pan-STARRS || L5 || align=right | 11 km || 
|-id=423 bgcolor=#C2FFFF
| 485423 ||  || — || August 2, 2011 || Haleakala || Pan-STARRS || L5 || align=right | 9.9 km || 
|-id=424 bgcolor=#fefefe
| 485424 ||  || — || August 23, 2011 || Haleakala || Pan-STARRS || — || align=right data-sort-value="0.83" | 830 m || 
|-id=425 bgcolor=#fefefe
| 485425 ||  || — || August 20, 2011 || Haleakala || Pan-STARRS || — || align=right data-sort-value="0.75" | 750 m || 
|-id=426 bgcolor=#fefefe
| 485426 ||  || — || August 8, 2004 || Socorro || LINEAR || — || align=right data-sort-value="0.78" | 780 m || 
|-id=427 bgcolor=#E9E9E9
| 485427 ||  || — || August 23, 2011 || Socorro || LINEAR || — || align=right | 1.8 km || 
|-id=428 bgcolor=#E9E9E9
| 485428 ||  || — || August 20, 2011 || Haleakala || Pan-STARRS || — || align=right data-sort-value="0.99" | 990 m || 
|-id=429 bgcolor=#fefefe
| 485429 ||  || — || May 30, 2010 || WISE || WISE || — || align=right | 2.4 km || 
|-id=430 bgcolor=#fefefe
| 485430 ||  || — || August 24, 2011 || La Sagra || OAM Obs. || MAS || align=right data-sort-value="0.81" | 810 m || 
|-id=431 bgcolor=#C2FFFF
| 485431 ||  || — || August 18, 2011 || Haleakala || Pan-STARRS || L5 || align=right | 14 km || 
|-id=432 bgcolor=#E9E9E9
| 485432 ||  || — || November 14, 2007 || Catalina || CSS || — || align=right | 1.7 km || 
|-id=433 bgcolor=#fefefe
| 485433 ||  || — || August 30, 2011 || Haleakala || Pan-STARRS || V || align=right data-sort-value="0.68" | 680 m || 
|-id=434 bgcolor=#E9E9E9
| 485434 ||  || — || August 30, 2011 || Haleakala || Pan-STARRS || — || align=right data-sort-value="0.67" | 670 m || 
|-id=435 bgcolor=#E9E9E9
| 485435 ||  || — || August 26, 2011 || La Sagra || OAM Obs. || — || align=right | 2.3 km || 
|-id=436 bgcolor=#fefefe
| 485436 ||  || — || August 27, 2011 || Haleakala || Pan-STARRS || — || align=right | 1.0 km || 
|-id=437 bgcolor=#fefefe
| 485437 ||  || — || August 31, 2011 || Haleakala || Pan-STARRS || V || align=right data-sort-value="0.66" | 660 m || 
|-id=438 bgcolor=#fefefe
| 485438 ||  || — || August 30, 2011 || La Sagra || OAM Obs. || — || align=right | 1.1 km || 
|-id=439 bgcolor=#C2FFFF
| 485439 ||  || — || February 25, 2006 || Mount Lemmon || Mount Lemmon Survey || L5 || align=right | 9.0 km || 
|-id=440 bgcolor=#fefefe
| 485440 ||  || — || August 23, 2011 || Haleakala || Pan-STARRS || — || align=right data-sort-value="0.92" | 920 m || 
|-id=441 bgcolor=#fefefe
| 485441 ||  || — || August 27, 2011 || La Sagra || OAM Obs. || — || align=right | 1.0 km || 
|-id=442 bgcolor=#fefefe
| 485442 ||  || — || August 23, 2011 || Haleakala || Pan-STARRS || — || align=right | 1.1 km || 
|-id=443 bgcolor=#fefefe
| 485443 ||  || — || August 28, 2011 || Haleakala || Pan-STARRS || — || align=right data-sort-value="0.79" | 790 m || 
|-id=444 bgcolor=#fefefe
| 485444 ||  || — || August 29, 2011 || La Sagra || OAM Obs. || V || align=right data-sort-value="0.76" | 760 m || 
|-id=445 bgcolor=#fefefe
| 485445 ||  || — || August 24, 2011 || Haleakala || Pan-STARRS || — || align=right data-sort-value="0.98" | 980 m || 
|-id=446 bgcolor=#E9E9E9
| 485446 ||  || — || September 25, 1998 || Xinglong || SCAP || — || align=right | 1.2 km || 
|-id=447 bgcolor=#fefefe
| 485447 ||  || — || August 27, 2011 || Haleakala || Pan-STARRS || — || align=right | 1.1 km || 
|-id=448 bgcolor=#fefefe
| 485448 ||  || — || August 27, 2011 || Haleakala || Pan-STARRS || — || align=right data-sort-value="0.82" | 820 m || 
|-id=449 bgcolor=#C2FFFF
| 485449 ||  || — || February 9, 2005 || Mount Lemmon || Mount Lemmon Survey || L5 || align=right | 8.4 km || 
|-id=450 bgcolor=#fefefe
| 485450 ||  || — || July 22, 2011 || Haleakala || Pan-STARRS || V || align=right data-sort-value="0.83" | 830 m || 
|-id=451 bgcolor=#C2FFFF
| 485451 ||  || — || November 20, 2014 || Haleakala || Pan-STARRS || L5 || align=right | 7.3 km || 
|-id=452 bgcolor=#C2FFFF
| 485452 ||  || — || February 2, 2006 || Kitt Peak || Spacewatch || L5 || align=right | 7.5 km || 
|-id=453 bgcolor=#fefefe
| 485453 ||  || — || September 2, 2011 || Haleakala || Pan-STARRS || V || align=right data-sort-value="0.62" | 620 m || 
|-id=454 bgcolor=#fefefe
| 485454 ||  || — || February 19, 2010 || Kitt Peak || Spacewatch || — || align=right data-sort-value="0.75" | 750 m || 
|-id=455 bgcolor=#fefefe
| 485455 ||  || — || August 20, 2011 || Haleakala || Pan-STARRS || NYS || align=right data-sort-value="0.60" | 600 m || 
|-id=456 bgcolor=#C2FFFF
| 485456 ||  || — || September 5, 2011 || Haleakala || Pan-STARRS || L5 || align=right | 7.8 km || 
|-id=457 bgcolor=#E9E9E9
| 485457 ||  || — || September 5, 2011 || Haleakala || Pan-STARRS || — || align=right | 2.6 km || 
|-id=458 bgcolor=#E9E9E9
| 485458 ||  || — || September 10, 2007 || Kitt Peak || Spacewatch || — || align=right data-sort-value="0.66" | 660 m || 
|-id=459 bgcolor=#fefefe
| 485459 ||  || — || September 4, 2011 || Haleakala || Pan-STARRS || — || align=right data-sort-value="0.98" | 980 m || 
|-id=460 bgcolor=#E9E9E9
| 485460 ||  || — || September 2, 2011 || Haleakala || Pan-STARRS || — || align=right | 1.7 km || 
|-id=461 bgcolor=#E9E9E9
| 485461 ||  || — || August 11, 2011 || Haleakala || Pan-STARRS || — || align=right | 1.7 km || 
|-id=462 bgcolor=#E9E9E9
| 485462 ||  || — || September 4, 2011 || Haleakala || Pan-STARRS || — || align=right | 1.3 km || 
|-id=463 bgcolor=#fefefe
| 485463 ||  || — || September 7, 2011 || Kitt Peak || Spacewatch || — || align=right data-sort-value="0.78" | 780 m || 
|-id=464 bgcolor=#fefefe
| 485464 ||  || — || October 26, 2008 || Kitt Peak || Spacewatch || V || align=right data-sort-value="0.65" | 650 m || 
|-id=465 bgcolor=#E9E9E9
| 485465 ||  || — || September 10, 2007 || Mount Lemmon || Mount Lemmon Survey || — || align=right | 1.00 km || 
|-id=466 bgcolor=#E9E9E9
| 485466 ||  || — || December 17, 2003 || Anderson Mesa || LONEOS || — || align=right | 1.6 km || 
|-id=467 bgcolor=#E9E9E9
| 485467 ||  || — || August 30, 2011 || Haleakala || Pan-STARRS || — || align=right | 1.0 km || 
|-id=468 bgcolor=#E9E9E9
| 485468 ||  || — || December 30, 2007 || Catalina || CSS || — || align=right | 1.5 km || 
|-id=469 bgcolor=#E9E9E9
| 485469 ||  || — || September 20, 2011 || Kitt Peak || Spacewatch || — || align=right | 1.4 km || 
|-id=470 bgcolor=#fefefe
| 485470 ||  || — || September 5, 2011 || La Sagra || OAM Obs. || V || align=right data-sort-value="0.89" | 890 m || 
|-id=471 bgcolor=#fefefe
| 485471 ||  || — || September 20, 2011 || Mount Lemmon || Mount Lemmon Survey || V || align=right data-sort-value="0.54" | 540 m || 
|-id=472 bgcolor=#E9E9E9
| 485472 ||  || — || September 23, 2011 || Mount Lemmon || Mount Lemmon Survey || — || align=right data-sort-value="0.94" | 940 m || 
|-id=473 bgcolor=#E9E9E9
| 485473 ||  || — || September 21, 2011 || Haleakala || Pan-STARRS || EUN || align=right | 1.1 km || 
|-id=474 bgcolor=#fefefe
| 485474 ||  || — || March 18, 2010 || Mount Lemmon || Mount Lemmon Survey || CLA || align=right | 1.2 km || 
|-id=475 bgcolor=#fefefe
| 485475 ||  || — || June 8, 2011 || Haleakala || Pan-STARRS || — || align=right | 1.2 km || 
|-id=476 bgcolor=#E9E9E9
| 485476 ||  || — || December 28, 2003 || Socorro || LINEAR || — || align=right | 1.4 km || 
|-id=477 bgcolor=#E9E9E9
| 485477 ||  || — || September 18, 2007 || Mount Lemmon || Mount Lemmon Survey || — || align=right | 1.3 km || 
|-id=478 bgcolor=#E9E9E9
| 485478 ||  || — || September 4, 2011 || Haleakala || Pan-STARRS || ADE || align=right | 2.0 km || 
|-id=479 bgcolor=#C2FFFF
| 485479 ||  || — || September 24, 2011 || Haleakala || Pan-STARRS || L5 || align=right | 8.9 km || 
|-id=480 bgcolor=#E9E9E9
| 485480 ||  || — || September 22, 2011 || Kitt Peak || Spacewatch || — || align=right | 1.1 km || 
|-id=481 bgcolor=#E9E9E9
| 485481 ||  || — || September 22, 2011 || Kitt Peak || Spacewatch || — || align=right data-sort-value="0.89" | 890 m || 
|-id=482 bgcolor=#E9E9E9
| 485482 ||  || — || September 22, 2011 || Kitt Peak || Spacewatch || EUN || align=right | 1.1 km || 
|-id=483 bgcolor=#E9E9E9
| 485483 ||  || — || November 5, 2007 || Kitt Peak || Spacewatch || — || align=right | 1.5 km || 
|-id=484 bgcolor=#E9E9E9
| 485484 ||  || — || September 20, 2011 || Kitt Peak || Spacewatch || — || align=right | 1.5 km || 
|-id=485 bgcolor=#E9E9E9
| 485485 ||  || — || September 24, 2011 || Mount Lemmon || Mount Lemmon Survey || — || align=right | 1.9 km || 
|-id=486 bgcolor=#E9E9E9
| 485486 ||  || — || February 11, 2004 || Kitt Peak || Spacewatch || — || align=right | 1.2 km || 
|-id=487 bgcolor=#E9E9E9
| 485487 ||  || — || February 1, 2005 || Kitt Peak || Spacewatch || — || align=right data-sort-value="0.81" | 810 m || 
|-id=488 bgcolor=#E9E9E9
| 485488 ||  || — || January 18, 2004 || Kitt Peak || Spacewatch || — || align=right | 1.1 km || 
|-id=489 bgcolor=#fefefe
| 485489 ||  || — || October 8, 2004 || Kitt Peak || Spacewatch || — || align=right data-sort-value="0.71" | 710 m || 
|-id=490 bgcolor=#E9E9E9
| 485490 ||  || — || September 15, 2007 || Mount Lemmon || Mount Lemmon Survey || (5) || align=right data-sort-value="0.65" | 650 m || 
|-id=491 bgcolor=#E9E9E9
| 485491 ||  || — || September 21, 2011 || La Sagra || OAM Obs. || — || align=right | 5.4 km || 
|-id=492 bgcolor=#fefefe
| 485492 ||  || — || June 9, 2011 || Mount Lemmon || Mount Lemmon Survey || — || align=right data-sort-value="0.94" | 940 m || 
|-id=493 bgcolor=#E9E9E9
| 485493 ||  || — || December 4, 2007 || Mount Lemmon || Mount Lemmon Survey || — || align=right | 1.3 km || 
|-id=494 bgcolor=#E9E9E9
| 485494 ||  || — || September 22, 2011 || Kitt Peak || Spacewatch || — || align=right | 1.3 km || 
|-id=495 bgcolor=#fefefe
| 485495 ||  || — || September 24, 2011 || Catalina || CSS || — || align=right data-sort-value="0.99" | 990 m || 
|-id=496 bgcolor=#fefefe
| 485496 ||  || — || September 26, 2011 || Haleakala || Pan-STARRS || NYS || align=right data-sort-value="0.68" | 680 m || 
|-id=497 bgcolor=#E9E9E9
| 485497 ||  || — || April 18, 2009 || Mount Lemmon || Mount Lemmon Survey || — || align=right | 2.3 km || 
|-id=498 bgcolor=#fefefe
| 485498 ||  || — || September 20, 2011 || Haleakala || Pan-STARRS || SUL || align=right | 1.8 km || 
|-id=499 bgcolor=#E9E9E9
| 485499 ||  || — || August 27, 2011 || Haleakala || Pan-STARRS || — || align=right | 1.4 km || 
|-id=500 bgcolor=#E9E9E9
| 485500 ||  || — || October 1, 2002 || Anderson Mesa || LONEOS || — || align=right | 2.0 km || 
|}

485501–485600 

|-bgcolor=#E9E9E9
| 485501 ||  || — || September 4, 2011 || Haleakala || Pan-STARRS || — || align=right data-sort-value="0.77" | 770 m || 
|-id=502 bgcolor=#E9E9E9
| 485502 ||  || — || January 30, 2000 || Kitt Peak || Spacewatch || — || align=right | 1.3 km || 
|-id=503 bgcolor=#E9E9E9
| 485503 ||  || — || November 11, 2006 || Mount Lemmon || Mount Lemmon Survey || — || align=right | 2.3 km || 
|-id=504 bgcolor=#E9E9E9
| 485504 ||  || — || September 26, 2011 || Haleakala || Pan-STARRS || — || align=right data-sort-value="0.67" | 670 m || 
|-id=505 bgcolor=#E9E9E9
| 485505 ||  || — || August 27, 2011 || Haleakala || Pan-STARRS || — || align=right | 2.4 km || 
|-id=506 bgcolor=#E9E9E9
| 485506 ||  || — || September 19, 2011 || Haleakala || Pan-STARRS || — || align=right | 2.3 km || 
|-id=507 bgcolor=#C2FFFF
| 485507 ||  || — || August 30, 2011 || Haleakala || Pan-STARRS || L5 || align=right | 8.7 km || 
|-id=508 bgcolor=#E9E9E9
| 485508 ||  || — || December 13, 2007 || Socorro || LINEAR || — || align=right | 1.4 km || 
|-id=509 bgcolor=#E9E9E9
| 485509 ||  || — || September 20, 2011 || Haleakala || Pan-STARRS || — || align=right | 2.1 km || 
|-id=510 bgcolor=#E9E9E9
| 485510 ||  || — || January 26, 1992 || Kitt Peak || Spacewatch || — || align=right | 1.3 km || 
|-id=511 bgcolor=#E9E9E9
| 485511 ||  || — || October 22, 2003 || Kitt Peak || Spacewatch || — || align=right data-sort-value="0.69" | 690 m || 
|-id=512 bgcolor=#FA8072
| 485512 ||  || — || September 11, 2007 || Kitt Peak || Spacewatch || — || align=right | 1.0 km || 
|-id=513 bgcolor=#E9E9E9
| 485513 ||  || — || September 21, 2011 || Catalina || CSS || — || align=right | 1.8 km || 
|-id=514 bgcolor=#E9E9E9
| 485514 ||  || — || June 28, 2011 || Mount Lemmon || Mount Lemmon Survey || — || align=right | 1.5 km || 
|-id=515 bgcolor=#E9E9E9
| 485515 ||  || — || December 14, 2007 || Kitt Peak || Spacewatch || — || align=right | 1.1 km || 
|-id=516 bgcolor=#E9E9E9
| 485516 ||  || — || October 18, 2011 || Mount Lemmon || Mount Lemmon Survey || — || align=right | 1.5 km || 
|-id=517 bgcolor=#E9E9E9
| 485517 ||  || — || October 14, 2007 || Catalina || CSS || — || align=right data-sort-value="0.84" | 840 m || 
|-id=518 bgcolor=#E9E9E9
| 485518 ||  || — || September 23, 2011 || Kitt Peak || Spacewatch || — || align=right data-sort-value="0.81" | 810 m || 
|-id=519 bgcolor=#E9E9E9
| 485519 ||  || — || October 24, 2007 || Mount Lemmon || Mount Lemmon Survey || — || align=right | 1.2 km || 
|-id=520 bgcolor=#E9E9E9
| 485520 ||  || — || September 21, 2011 || Mount Lemmon || Mount Lemmon Survey || — || align=right | 1.6 km || 
|-id=521 bgcolor=#E9E9E9
| 485521 ||  || — || October 18, 2011 || Mount Lemmon || Mount Lemmon Survey || — || align=right | 1.4 km || 
|-id=522 bgcolor=#E9E9E9
| 485522 ||  || — || October 18, 2011 || Mount Lemmon || Mount Lemmon Survey || — || align=right | 1.8 km || 
|-id=523 bgcolor=#E9E9E9
| 485523 ||  || — || October 18, 2011 || Mount Lemmon || Mount Lemmon Survey || — || align=right | 2.6 km || 
|-id=524 bgcolor=#E9E9E9
| 485524 ||  || — || December 4, 2007 || Catalina || CSS || — || align=right | 1.2 km || 
|-id=525 bgcolor=#E9E9E9
| 485525 ||  || — || September 27, 2011 || Mount Lemmon || Mount Lemmon Survey || — || align=right | 1.1 km || 
|-id=526 bgcolor=#E9E9E9
| 485526 ||  || — || October 9, 2002 || Socorro || LINEAR || — || align=right | 1.2 km || 
|-id=527 bgcolor=#E9E9E9
| 485527 ||  || — || October 19, 2011 || Mount Lemmon || Mount Lemmon Survey || — || align=right | 1.5 km || 
|-id=528 bgcolor=#E9E9E9
| 485528 ||  || — || October 20, 2011 || Mount Lemmon || Mount Lemmon Survey || NEM || align=right | 1.8 km || 
|-id=529 bgcolor=#fefefe
| 485529 ||  || — || September 24, 2011 || Haleakala || Pan-STARRS || — || align=right data-sort-value="0.68" | 680 m || 
|-id=530 bgcolor=#E9E9E9
| 485530 ||  || — || October 17, 1998 || Anderson Mesa || LONEOS || — || align=right | 1.5 km || 
|-id=531 bgcolor=#E9E9E9
| 485531 ||  || — || October 18, 2011 || Kitt Peak || Spacewatch || — || align=right | 1.3 km || 
|-id=532 bgcolor=#E9E9E9
| 485532 ||  || — || October 18, 2011 || Kitt Peak || Spacewatch || — || align=right | 1.2 km || 
|-id=533 bgcolor=#fefefe
| 485533 ||  || — || September 25, 2007 || Mount Lemmon || Mount Lemmon Survey || — || align=right | 1.2 km || 
|-id=534 bgcolor=#E9E9E9
| 485534 ||  || — || September 27, 2011 || Mount Lemmon || Mount Lemmon Survey || — || align=right | 1.4 km || 
|-id=535 bgcolor=#E9E9E9
| 485535 ||  || — || October 21, 2011 || Mount Lemmon || Mount Lemmon Survey || EUN || align=right | 1.0 km || 
|-id=536 bgcolor=#E9E9E9
| 485536 ||  || — || October 21, 2011 || Socorro || LINEAR || — || align=right | 1.6 km || 
|-id=537 bgcolor=#fefefe
| 485537 ||  || — || October 20, 2011 || Mount Lemmon || Mount Lemmon Survey || — || align=right data-sort-value="0.89" | 890 m || 
|-id=538 bgcolor=#E9E9E9
| 485538 ||  || — || October 18, 2011 || Kitt Peak || Spacewatch || — || align=right | 1.2 km || 
|-id=539 bgcolor=#E9E9E9
| 485539 ||  || — || November 18, 2007 || Mount Lemmon || Mount Lemmon Survey || — || align=right | 1.2 km || 
|-id=540 bgcolor=#E9E9E9
| 485540 ||  || — || December 16, 2007 || Kitt Peak || Spacewatch || — || align=right | 1.4 km || 
|-id=541 bgcolor=#E9E9E9
| 485541 ||  || — || October 21, 2011 || Mount Lemmon || Mount Lemmon Survey || — || align=right | 1.3 km || 
|-id=542 bgcolor=#E9E9E9
| 485542 ||  || — || October 18, 2011 || Mount Lemmon || Mount Lemmon Survey || — || align=right | 1.7 km || 
|-id=543 bgcolor=#E9E9E9
| 485543 ||  || — || September 14, 2007 || Mount Lemmon || Mount Lemmon Survey || — || align=right data-sort-value="0.75" | 750 m || 
|-id=544 bgcolor=#E9E9E9
| 485544 ||  || — || October 18, 2011 || Kitt Peak || Spacewatch || — || align=right | 1.2 km || 
|-id=545 bgcolor=#E9E9E9
| 485545 ||  || — || August 30, 2002 || Socorro || LINEAR || — || align=right | 2.7 km || 
|-id=546 bgcolor=#E9E9E9
| 485546 ||  || — || September 24, 2011 || Mount Lemmon || Mount Lemmon Survey || — || align=right | 1.4 km || 
|-id=547 bgcolor=#E9E9E9
| 485547 ||  || — || September 27, 2011 || Mount Lemmon || Mount Lemmon Survey || — || align=right | 1.3 km || 
|-id=548 bgcolor=#d6d6d6
| 485548 ||  || — || October 24, 2011 || Mount Lemmon || Mount Lemmon Survey || — || align=right | 2.6 km || 
|-id=549 bgcolor=#fefefe
| 485549 ||  || — || June 11, 2011 || Haleakala || Pan-STARRS || — || align=right data-sort-value="0.96" | 960 m || 
|-id=550 bgcolor=#fefefe
| 485550 ||  || — || September 6, 2011 || La Sagra || OAM Obs. || — || align=right | 1.0 km || 
|-id=551 bgcolor=#E9E9E9
| 485551 ||  || — || September 26, 2011 || La Sagra || OAM Obs. || — || align=right | 1.9 km || 
|-id=552 bgcolor=#E9E9E9
| 485552 ||  || — || September 25, 2011 || Haleakala || Pan-STARRS || — || align=right data-sort-value="0.94" | 940 m || 
|-id=553 bgcolor=#E9E9E9
| 485553 ||  || — || October 24, 2011 || Haleakala || Pan-STARRS || — || align=right | 1.1 km || 
|-id=554 bgcolor=#E9E9E9
| 485554 ||  || — || December 15, 2007 || Kitt Peak || Spacewatch || — || align=right | 1.2 km || 
|-id=555 bgcolor=#E9E9E9
| 485555 ||  || — || October 23, 2011 || Haleakala || Pan-STARRS || — || align=right | 1.0 km || 
|-id=556 bgcolor=#E9E9E9
| 485556 ||  || — || September 23, 2011 || Catalina || CSS || GEF || align=right | 1.3 km || 
|-id=557 bgcolor=#E9E9E9
| 485557 ||  || — || October 23, 2011 || Kitt Peak || Spacewatch || — || align=right | 2.0 km || 
|-id=558 bgcolor=#E9E9E9
| 485558 ||  || — || October 18, 2011 || Catalina || CSS || EUN || align=right | 1.2 km || 
|-id=559 bgcolor=#E9E9E9
| 485559 ||  || — || October 24, 2011 || Kitt Peak || Spacewatch || — || align=right | 1.0 km || 
|-id=560 bgcolor=#E9E9E9
| 485560 ||  || — || January 13, 2008 || Catalina || CSS || — || align=right | 1.3 km || 
|-id=561 bgcolor=#E9E9E9
| 485561 ||  || — || September 29, 2011 || Mount Lemmon || Mount Lemmon Survey || EUN || align=right | 1.1 km || 
|-id=562 bgcolor=#E9E9E9
| 485562 ||  || — || October 24, 2011 || Haleakala || Pan-STARRS || — || align=right | 1.8 km || 
|-id=563 bgcolor=#d6d6d6
| 485563 ||  || — || October 25, 2011 || Haleakala || Pan-STARRS || — || align=right | 3.2 km || 
|-id=564 bgcolor=#E9E9E9
| 485564 ||  || — || February 3, 2008 || Mount Lemmon || Mount Lemmon Survey || — || align=right | 2.2 km || 
|-id=565 bgcolor=#E9E9E9
| 485565 ||  || — || October 15, 2007 || Kitt Peak || Spacewatch || — || align=right data-sort-value="0.64" | 640 m || 
|-id=566 bgcolor=#E9E9E9
| 485566 ||  || — || November 19, 2007 || Mount Lemmon || Mount Lemmon Survey || — || align=right | 1.4 km || 
|-id=567 bgcolor=#E9E9E9
| 485567 ||  || — || September 23, 2011 || Kitt Peak || Spacewatch || ADE || align=right | 1.9 km || 
|-id=568 bgcolor=#E9E9E9
| 485568 ||  || — || October 24, 2011 || Kitt Peak || Spacewatch || — || align=right | 1.5 km || 
|-id=569 bgcolor=#E9E9E9
| 485569 ||  || — || October 24, 2011 || Kitt Peak || Spacewatch || — || align=right | 1.2 km || 
|-id=570 bgcolor=#E9E9E9
| 485570 ||  || — || October 24, 2011 || Kitt Peak || Spacewatch || — || align=right | 1.8 km || 
|-id=571 bgcolor=#E9E9E9
| 485571 ||  || — || October 25, 2011 || Haleakala || Pan-STARRS || MAR || align=right | 1.1 km || 
|-id=572 bgcolor=#E9E9E9
| 485572 ||  || — || October 25, 2011 || Haleakala || Pan-STARRS || — || align=right | 1.2 km || 
|-id=573 bgcolor=#E9E9E9
| 485573 ||  || — || October 25, 2011 || Haleakala || Pan-STARRS || (5) || align=right data-sort-value="0.78" | 780 m || 
|-id=574 bgcolor=#E9E9E9
| 485574 ||  || — || October 25, 2011 || Haleakala || Pan-STARRS || — || align=right | 1.5 km || 
|-id=575 bgcolor=#E9E9E9
| 485575 ||  || — || October 20, 2011 || Mount Lemmon || Mount Lemmon Survey || — || align=right | 1.2 km || 
|-id=576 bgcolor=#E9E9E9
| 485576 ||  || — || October 18, 2011 || Haleakala || Pan-STARRS || EUN || align=right | 1.4 km || 
|-id=577 bgcolor=#E9E9E9
| 485577 ||  || — || October 21, 2011 || Kitt Peak || Spacewatch || — || align=right | 1.2 km || 
|-id=578 bgcolor=#E9E9E9
| 485578 ||  || — || October 25, 2011 || Kitt Peak || Spacewatch || — || align=right | 1.4 km || 
|-id=579 bgcolor=#E9E9E9
| 485579 ||  || — || October 25, 2011 || Haleakala || Pan-STARRS || MAR || align=right | 1.3 km || 
|-id=580 bgcolor=#E9E9E9
| 485580 ||  || — || October 25, 2011 || Haleakala || Pan-STARRS || — || align=right | 2.2 km || 
|-id=581 bgcolor=#E9E9E9
| 485581 ||  || — || October 25, 2011 || Haleakala || Pan-STARRS || — || align=right | 1.2 km || 
|-id=582 bgcolor=#E9E9E9
| 485582 ||  || — || October 19, 2011 || Mount Lemmon || Mount Lemmon Survey || — || align=right | 1.2 km || 
|-id=583 bgcolor=#E9E9E9
| 485583 ||  || — || December 15, 2007 || Kitt Peak || Spacewatch || — || align=right | 1.5 km || 
|-id=584 bgcolor=#E9E9E9
| 485584 ||  || — || October 21, 2011 || Mount Lemmon || Mount Lemmon Survey || — || align=right | 1.5 km || 
|-id=585 bgcolor=#E9E9E9
| 485585 ||  || — || October 26, 2011 || Haleakala || Pan-STARRS || — || align=right | 1.5 km || 
|-id=586 bgcolor=#E9E9E9
| 485586 ||  || — || October 26, 2011 || Haleakala || Pan-STARRS || — || align=right | 1.0 km || 
|-id=587 bgcolor=#E9E9E9
| 485587 ||  || — || November 7, 2007 || Kitt Peak || Spacewatch || — || align=right | 1.3 km || 
|-id=588 bgcolor=#E9E9E9
| 485588 ||  || — || October 26, 2011 || Haleakala || Pan-STARRS || — || align=right | 1.7 km || 
|-id=589 bgcolor=#E9E9E9
| 485589 ||  || — || April 2, 2009 || Kitt Peak || Spacewatch || — || align=right | 1.6 km || 
|-id=590 bgcolor=#E9E9E9
| 485590 ||  || — || October 25, 2011 || Haleakala || Pan-STARRS || — || align=right | 1.3 km || 
|-id=591 bgcolor=#E9E9E9
| 485591 ||  || — || October 25, 2011 || Haleakala || Pan-STARRS || — || align=right | 2.0 km || 
|-id=592 bgcolor=#E9E9E9
| 485592 ||  || — || October 25, 2011 || Haleakala || Pan-STARRS ||  || align=right | 1.2 km || 
|-id=593 bgcolor=#E9E9E9
| 485593 ||  || — || May 8, 2005 || Kitt Peak || Spacewatch || — || align=right | 1.5 km || 
|-id=594 bgcolor=#E9E9E9
| 485594 ||  || — || September 25, 2006 || Kitt Peak || Spacewatch ||  || align=right | 1.6 km || 
|-id=595 bgcolor=#E9E9E9
| 485595 ||  || — || October 26, 2011 || Haleakala || Pan-STARRS || — || align=right | 1.4 km || 
|-id=596 bgcolor=#E9E9E9
| 485596 ||  || — || November 18, 2007 || Mount Lemmon || Mount Lemmon Survey || — || align=right | 1.4 km || 
|-id=597 bgcolor=#E9E9E9
| 485597 ||  || — || November 19, 2007 || Mount Lemmon || Mount Lemmon Survey || — || align=right data-sort-value="0.83" | 830 m || 
|-id=598 bgcolor=#E9E9E9
| 485598 ||  || — || October 24, 2011 || Haleakala || Pan-STARRS || — || align=right data-sort-value="0.98" | 980 m || 
|-id=599 bgcolor=#E9E9E9
| 485599 ||  || — || October 23, 2011 || Kitt Peak || Spacewatch || — || align=right | 1.3 km || 
|-id=600 bgcolor=#E9E9E9
| 485600 ||  || — || September 24, 2011 || Haleakala || Pan-STARRS || — || align=right | 1.2 km || 
|}

485601–485700 

|-bgcolor=#fefefe
| 485601 ||  || — || April 8, 2003 || Palomar || NEAT || — || align=right data-sort-value="0.97" | 970 m || 
|-id=602 bgcolor=#fefefe
| 485602 ||  || — || September 4, 2011 || Haleakala || Pan-STARRS || — || align=right | 1.1 km || 
|-id=603 bgcolor=#E9E9E9
| 485603 ||  || — || October 19, 2011 || Kitt Peak || Spacewatch || — || align=right | 1.3 km || 
|-id=604 bgcolor=#E9E9E9
| 485604 ||  || — || October 2, 2002 || Socorro || LINEAR || — || align=right | 1.5 km || 
|-id=605 bgcolor=#E9E9E9
| 485605 ||  || — || October 28, 2011 || Kitt Peak || Spacewatch || — || align=right | 1.4 km || 
|-id=606 bgcolor=#fefefe
| 485606 ||  || — || September 25, 2011 || Haleakala || Pan-STARRS || — || align=right data-sort-value="0.90" | 900 m || 
|-id=607 bgcolor=#E9E9E9
| 485607 ||  || — || October 28, 2011 || Catalina || CSS || — || align=right | 1.2 km || 
|-id=608 bgcolor=#E9E9E9
| 485608 ||  || — || October 18, 2011 || Haleakala || Pan-STARRS || — || align=right | 2.6 km || 
|-id=609 bgcolor=#E9E9E9
| 485609 ||  || — || October 27, 2011 || Mount Lemmon || Mount Lemmon Survey || — || align=right | 1.2 km || 
|-id=610 bgcolor=#E9E9E9
| 485610 ||  || — || January 11, 2008 || Mount Lemmon || Mount Lemmon Survey || AEO || align=right data-sort-value="0.85" | 850 m || 
|-id=611 bgcolor=#E9E9E9
| 485611 ||  || — || November 2, 2007 || Kitt Peak || Spacewatch || — || align=right data-sort-value="0.82" | 820 m || 
|-id=612 bgcolor=#E9E9E9
| 485612 ||  || — || October 25, 2011 || Haleakala || Pan-STARRS || — || align=right | 1.5 km || 
|-id=613 bgcolor=#E9E9E9
| 485613 ||  || — || September 24, 2011 || Mount Lemmon || Mount Lemmon Survey || — || align=right | 1.3 km || 
|-id=614 bgcolor=#E9E9E9
| 485614 ||  || — || October 31, 2011 || XuYi || PMO NEO || — || align=right | 1.7 km || 
|-id=615 bgcolor=#E9E9E9
| 485615 ||  || — || October 21, 2011 || Catalina || CSS || — || align=right | 1.9 km || 
|-id=616 bgcolor=#E9E9E9
| 485616 ||  || — || October 27, 2011 || Catalina || CSS || JUN || align=right | 1.0 km || 
|-id=617 bgcolor=#E9E9E9
| 485617 ||  || — || January 18, 2008 || Mount Lemmon || Mount Lemmon Survey || DOR || align=right | 2.1 km || 
|-id=618 bgcolor=#E9E9E9
| 485618 ||  || — || October 12, 2007 || Anderson Mesa || LONEOS || MAR || align=right | 1.1 km || 
|-id=619 bgcolor=#E9E9E9
| 485619 ||  || — || September 4, 2011 || Haleakala || Pan-STARRS || — || align=right | 1.6 km || 
|-id=620 bgcolor=#E9E9E9
| 485620 ||  || — || December 13, 2007 || Socorro || LINEAR || — || align=right | 1.8 km || 
|-id=621 bgcolor=#E9E9E9
| 485621 ||  || — || September 21, 2011 || Kitt Peak || Spacewatch || — || align=right | 1.5 km || 
|-id=622 bgcolor=#E9E9E9
| 485622 ||  || — || February 16, 2004 || Kitt Peak || Spacewatch || — || align=right | 1.2 km || 
|-id=623 bgcolor=#d6d6d6
| 485623 ||  || — || October 21, 2011 || Mount Lemmon || Mount Lemmon Survey || — || align=right | 2.7 km || 
|-id=624 bgcolor=#E9E9E9
| 485624 ||  || — || October 21, 2011 || Mount Lemmon || Mount Lemmon Survey || JUN || align=right data-sort-value="0.81" | 810 m || 
|-id=625 bgcolor=#E9E9E9
| 485625 ||  || — || November 13, 2007 || Kitt Peak || Spacewatch || — || align=right | 1.3 km || 
|-id=626 bgcolor=#E9E9E9
| 485626 ||  || — || December 4, 2007 || Mount Lemmon || Mount Lemmon Survey || — || align=right | 1.3 km || 
|-id=627 bgcolor=#E9E9E9
| 485627 ||  || — || October 23, 2011 || Haleakala || Pan-STARRS || MAR || align=right | 1.0 km || 
|-id=628 bgcolor=#E9E9E9
| 485628 ||  || — || November 2, 2007 || Kitt Peak || Spacewatch || — || align=right data-sort-value="0.91" | 910 m || 
|-id=629 bgcolor=#E9E9E9
| 485629 ||  || — || October 24, 2011 || Kitt Peak || Spacewatch || — || align=right | 1.0 km || 
|-id=630 bgcolor=#E9E9E9
| 485630 ||  || — || October 24, 2011 || Haleakala || Pan-STARRS || — || align=right | 1.8 km || 
|-id=631 bgcolor=#E9E9E9
| 485631 ||  || — || October 24, 2011 || Haleakala || Pan-STARRS || — || align=right | 1.3 km || 
|-id=632 bgcolor=#E9E9E9
| 485632 ||  || — || November 4, 2007 || Kitt Peak || Spacewatch || MAR || align=right data-sort-value="0.97" | 970 m || 
|-id=633 bgcolor=#E9E9E9
| 485633 ||  || — || October 26, 2011 || Haleakala || Pan-STARRS || — || align=right | 1.9 km || 
|-id=634 bgcolor=#E9E9E9
| 485634 ||  || — || November 11, 2007 || Mount Lemmon || Mount Lemmon Survey || — || align=right | 1.1 km || 
|-id=635 bgcolor=#E9E9E9
| 485635 ||  || — || May 9, 2010 || Mount Lemmon || Mount Lemmon Survey || — || align=right | 2.4 km || 
|-id=636 bgcolor=#E9E9E9
| 485636 ||  || — || October 16, 2007 || Catalina || CSS || — || align=right | 1.3 km || 
|-id=637 bgcolor=#E9E9E9
| 485637 ||  || — || December 5, 2007 || Kitt Peak || Spacewatch || — || align=right | 1.5 km || 
|-id=638 bgcolor=#E9E9E9
| 485638 ||  || — || September 24, 2011 || Haleakala || Pan-STARRS || — || align=right | 1.00 km || 
|-id=639 bgcolor=#E9E9E9
| 485639 ||  || — || October 21, 2011 || Mount Lemmon || Mount Lemmon Survey || — || align=right | 1.7 km || 
|-id=640 bgcolor=#E9E9E9
| 485640 ||  || — || October 18, 2011 || Haleakala || Pan-STARRS || MAR || align=right | 1.4 km || 
|-id=641 bgcolor=#E9E9E9
| 485641 ||  || — || November 21, 2007 || Catalina || CSS || EUN || align=right | 1.4 km || 
|-id=642 bgcolor=#E9E9E9
| 485642 ||  || — || December 13, 2007 || Socorro || LINEAR || — || align=right | 2.0 km || 
|-id=643 bgcolor=#E9E9E9
| 485643 ||  || — || October 29, 2011 || Haleakala || Pan-STARRS || EUN || align=right | 1.3 km || 
|-id=644 bgcolor=#E9E9E9
| 485644 ||  || — || November 18, 2011 || Mount Lemmon || Mount Lemmon Survey || — || align=right | 1.9 km || 
|-id=645 bgcolor=#E9E9E9
| 485645 ||  || — || July 6, 2010 || Mount Lemmon || Mount Lemmon Survey || MAR || align=right | 1.2 km || 
|-id=646 bgcolor=#E9E9E9
| 485646 ||  || — || October 1, 2011 || Mount Lemmon || Mount Lemmon Survey || — || align=right | 1.4 km || 
|-id=647 bgcolor=#E9E9E9
| 485647 ||  || — || September 15, 2006 || Kitt Peak || Spacewatch || — || align=right | 1.8 km || 
|-id=648 bgcolor=#E9E9E9
| 485648 ||  || — || October 24, 2011 || Haleakala || Pan-STARRS || — || align=right data-sort-value="0.94" | 940 m || 
|-id=649 bgcolor=#E9E9E9
| 485649 ||  || — || October 25, 2011 || Haleakala || Pan-STARRS || — || align=right | 1.1 km || 
|-id=650 bgcolor=#E9E9E9
| 485650 ||  || — || October 1, 2011 || Kitt Peak || Spacewatch || — || align=right | 1.2 km || 
|-id=651 bgcolor=#fefefe
| 485651 ||  || — || September 24, 2011 || Haleakala || Pan-STARRS || — || align=right data-sort-value="0.94" | 940 m || 
|-id=652 bgcolor=#FFC2E0
| 485652 ||  || — || November 23, 2011 || Kitt Peak || Spacewatch || APO +1kmPHA || align=right | 1.7 km || 
|-id=653 bgcolor=#d6d6d6
| 485653 ||  || — || November 24, 2011 || Haleakala || Pan-STARRS || — || align=right | 2.3 km || 
|-id=654 bgcolor=#E9E9E9
| 485654 ||  || — || December 5, 2002 || Socorro || LINEAR || — || align=right | 1.8 km || 
|-id=655 bgcolor=#d6d6d6
| 485655 ||  || — || November 23, 2011 || Kitt Peak || Spacewatch || — || align=right | 2.8 km || 
|-id=656 bgcolor=#d6d6d6
| 485656 ||  || — || October 25, 2011 || Haleakala || Pan-STARRS || — || align=right | 4.1 km || 
|-id=657 bgcolor=#E9E9E9
| 485657 ||  || — || October 26, 2011 || Haleakala || Pan-STARRS || — || align=right | 1.0 km || 
|-id=658 bgcolor=#E9E9E9
| 485658 ||  || — || November 2, 2011 || Mount Lemmon || Mount Lemmon Survey || — || align=right | 1.2 km || 
|-id=659 bgcolor=#E9E9E9
| 485659 ||  || — || May 17, 2005 || Mount Lemmon || Mount Lemmon Survey || — || align=right | 1.5 km || 
|-id=660 bgcolor=#d6d6d6
| 485660 ||  || — || November 25, 2011 || Haleakala || Pan-STARRS || — || align=right | 3.1 km || 
|-id=661 bgcolor=#E9E9E9
| 485661 ||  || — || October 25, 2011 || Haleakala || Pan-STARRS || — || align=right | 1.8 km || 
|-id=662 bgcolor=#E9E9E9
| 485662 ||  || — || November 24, 2011 || Haleakala || Pan-STARRS || — || align=right | 1.1 km || 
|-id=663 bgcolor=#E9E9E9
| 485663 ||  || — || November 17, 2011 || Mount Lemmon || Mount Lemmon Survey || — || align=right | 1.3 km || 
|-id=664 bgcolor=#E9E9E9
| 485664 ||  || — || February 13, 2008 || Kitt Peak || Spacewatch || — || align=right | 1.4 km || 
|-id=665 bgcolor=#E9E9E9
| 485665 ||  || — || November 24, 2011 || Mount Lemmon || Mount Lemmon Survey || — || align=right | 1.5 km || 
|-id=666 bgcolor=#d6d6d6
| 485666 ||  || — || June 13, 2010 || WISE || WISE || — || align=right | 3.5 km || 
|-id=667 bgcolor=#E9E9E9
| 485667 ||  || — || November 25, 2011 || Haleakala || Pan-STARRS || — || align=right | 1.3 km || 
|-id=668 bgcolor=#E9E9E9
| 485668 ||  || — || November 3, 2011 || Kitt Peak || Spacewatch || — || align=right data-sort-value="0.80" | 800 m || 
|-id=669 bgcolor=#E9E9E9
| 485669 ||  || — || January 11, 2008 || Mount Lemmon || Mount Lemmon Survey || NEM || align=right | 1.5 km || 
|-id=670 bgcolor=#d6d6d6
| 485670 ||  || — || October 25, 2011 || Haleakala || Pan-STARRS || — || align=right | 2.0 km || 
|-id=671 bgcolor=#d6d6d6
| 485671 ||  || — || November 28, 2011 || Haleakala || Pan-STARRS || — || align=right | 3.2 km || 
|-id=672 bgcolor=#E9E9E9
| 485672 ||  || — || October 25, 2011 || Haleakala || Pan-STARRS || (194) || align=right | 1.8 km || 
|-id=673 bgcolor=#E9E9E9
| 485673 ||  || — || November 17, 2011 || Kitt Peak || Spacewatch || — || align=right | 2.2 km || 
|-id=674 bgcolor=#E9E9E9
| 485674 ||  || — || November 25, 2011 || Haleakala || Pan-STARRS || — || align=right | 4.0 km || 
|-id=675 bgcolor=#E9E9E9
| 485675 ||  || — || November 5, 2011 || Haleakala || Pan-STARRS || — || align=right | 1.4 km || 
|-id=676 bgcolor=#E9E9E9
| 485676 ||  || — || December 14, 2007 || Socorro || LINEAR || EUN || align=right | 1.2 km || 
|-id=677 bgcolor=#E9E9E9
| 485677 ||  || — || October 14, 1998 || Kitt Peak || Spacewatch || — || align=right | 1.5 km || 
|-id=678 bgcolor=#E9E9E9
| 485678 ||  || — || November 18, 2011 || Catalina || CSS || — || align=right | 1.3 km || 
|-id=679 bgcolor=#E9E9E9
| 485679 ||  || — || September 16, 2006 || Kitt Peak || Spacewatch || — || align=right | 1.6 km || 
|-id=680 bgcolor=#E9E9E9
| 485680 ||  || — || November 3, 2011 || Kitt Peak || Spacewatch || — || align=right | 1.3 km || 
|-id=681 bgcolor=#E9E9E9
| 485681 ||  || — || October 31, 2011 || Kitt Peak || Spacewatch || — || align=right | 1.3 km || 
|-id=682 bgcolor=#E9E9E9
| 485682 ||  || — || January 19, 2008 || Mount Lemmon || Mount Lemmon Survey || — || align=right | 2.4 km || 
|-id=683 bgcolor=#E9E9E9
| 485683 ||  || — || November 17, 2011 || Catalina || CSS || — || align=right | 1.8 km || 
|-id=684 bgcolor=#E9E9E9
| 485684 ||  || — || October 21, 2011 || Mount Lemmon || Mount Lemmon Survey || — || align=right | 1.2 km || 
|-id=685 bgcolor=#E9E9E9
| 485685 ||  || — || October 26, 2011 || Haleakala || Pan-STARRS || — || align=right | 1.3 km || 
|-id=686 bgcolor=#E9E9E9
| 485686 ||  || — || November 25, 2011 || Haleakala || Pan-STARRS || — || align=right | 1.9 km || 
|-id=687 bgcolor=#E9E9E9
| 485687 ||  || — || November 3, 2011 || Mount Lemmon || Mount Lemmon Survey || — || align=right | 1.5 km || 
|-id=688 bgcolor=#d6d6d6
| 485688 ||  || — || October 23, 2011 || Haleakala || Pan-STARRS || — || align=right | 2.8 km || 
|-id=689 bgcolor=#E9E9E9
| 485689 ||  || — || February 13, 2008 || Mount Lemmon || Mount Lemmon Survey || — || align=right | 1.2 km || 
|-id=690 bgcolor=#E9E9E9
| 485690 ||  || — || November 26, 2011 || Haleakala || Pan-STARRS || — || align=right | 1.0 km || 
|-id=691 bgcolor=#E9E9E9
| 485691 ||  || — || December 6, 2011 || Haleakala || Pan-STARRS || — || align=right | 1.7 km || 
|-id=692 bgcolor=#E9E9E9
| 485692 ||  || — || January 15, 2004 || Kitt Peak || Spacewatch || ADE || align=right | 1.5 km || 
|-id=693 bgcolor=#E9E9E9
| 485693 ||  || — || September 24, 2011 || Haleakala || Pan-STARRS || — || align=right | 1.5 km || 
|-id=694 bgcolor=#E9E9E9
| 485694 ||  || — || December 31, 2007 || Kitt Peak || Spacewatch || — || align=right | 1.8 km || 
|-id=695 bgcolor=#E9E9E9
| 485695 ||  || — || November 24, 2011 || Mount Lemmon || Mount Lemmon Survey || GEF || align=right | 1.2 km || 
|-id=696 bgcolor=#E9E9E9
| 485696 ||  || — || October 22, 2006 || Catalina || CSS || NEM || align=right | 2.2 km || 
|-id=697 bgcolor=#E9E9E9
| 485697 ||  || — || October 20, 2011 || Mount Lemmon || Mount Lemmon Survey || — || align=right | 2.2 km || 
|-id=698 bgcolor=#E9E9E9
| 485698 ||  || — || December 17, 1993 || Kitt Peak || Spacewatch || — || align=right | 1.9 km || 
|-id=699 bgcolor=#d6d6d6
| 485699 ||  || — || November 4, 2010 || Mount Lemmon || Mount Lemmon Survey || — || align=right | 3.2 km || 
|-id=700 bgcolor=#E9E9E9
| 485700 ||  || — || November 14, 2006 || Kitt Peak || Spacewatch || — || align=right | 1.9 km || 
|}

485701–485800 

|-bgcolor=#d6d6d6
| 485701 ||  || — || December 26, 2011 || Kitt Peak || Spacewatch || — || align=right | 2.6 km || 
|-id=702 bgcolor=#fefefe
| 485702 ||  || — || May 16, 2010 || Catalina || CSS || H || align=right data-sort-value="0.84" | 840 m || 
|-id=703 bgcolor=#E9E9E9
| 485703 ||  || — || December 27, 2011 || Kitt Peak || Spacewatch || — || align=right | 2.4 km || 
|-id=704 bgcolor=#E9E9E9
| 485704 ||  || — || October 25, 2011 || Haleakala || Pan-STARRS || — || align=right | 2.1 km || 
|-id=705 bgcolor=#E9E9E9
| 485705 ||  || — || December 31, 2011 || Kitt Peak || Spacewatch || — || align=right | 1.9 km || 
|-id=706 bgcolor=#d6d6d6
| 485706 ||  || — || December 26, 2011 || Kitt Peak || Spacewatch || — || align=right | 3.2 km || 
|-id=707 bgcolor=#E9E9E9
| 485707 ||  || — || November 18, 2007 || Mount Lemmon || Mount Lemmon Survey || — || align=right | 2.3 km || 
|-id=708 bgcolor=#d6d6d6
| 485708 ||  || — || December 25, 2011 || Kitt Peak || Spacewatch || — || align=right | 3.1 km || 
|-id=709 bgcolor=#E9E9E9
| 485709 ||  || — || January 1, 2012 || Mount Lemmon || Mount Lemmon Survey || — || align=right | 2.4 km || 
|-id=710 bgcolor=#d6d6d6
| 485710 ||  || — || January 1, 2012 || Mount Lemmon || Mount Lemmon Survey || — || align=right | 3.4 km || 
|-id=711 bgcolor=#fefefe
| 485711 ||  || — || January 10, 2007 || Mount Lemmon || Mount Lemmon Survey || H || align=right data-sort-value="0.54" | 540 m || 
|-id=712 bgcolor=#FA8072
| 485712 ||  || — || November 24, 2011 || Mount Lemmon || Mount Lemmon Survey || — || align=right data-sort-value="0.49" | 490 m || 
|-id=713 bgcolor=#d6d6d6
| 485713 ||  || — || December 25, 2005 || Kitt Peak || Spacewatch || — || align=right | 2.7 km || 
|-id=714 bgcolor=#fefefe
| 485714 ||  || — || January 2, 2012 || Mount Lemmon || Mount Lemmon Survey || H || align=right data-sort-value="0.56" | 560 m || 
|-id=715 bgcolor=#E9E9E9
| 485715 ||  || — || November 5, 2010 || Mount Lemmon || Mount Lemmon Survey || — || align=right | 2.9 km || 
|-id=716 bgcolor=#E9E9E9
| 485716 ||  || — || December 1, 2011 || Haleakala || Pan-STARRS || — || align=right | 1.4 km || 
|-id=717 bgcolor=#FA8072
| 485717 ||  || — || January 9, 2005 || Catalina || CSS || — || align=right data-sort-value="0.73" | 730 m || 
|-id=718 bgcolor=#d6d6d6
| 485718 ||  || — || November 26, 2011 || Mount Lemmon || Mount Lemmon Survey || — || align=right | 2.5 km || 
|-id=719 bgcolor=#E9E9E9
| 485719 ||  || — || January 18, 2012 || Kitt Peak || Spacewatch || — || align=right | 2.7 km || 
|-id=720 bgcolor=#E9E9E9
| 485720 ||  || — || November 19, 2006 || Kitt Peak || Spacewatch || — || align=right | 2.6 km || 
|-id=721 bgcolor=#d6d6d6
| 485721 ||  || — || January 18, 2012 || Kitt Peak || Spacewatch || — || align=right | 3.2 km || 
|-id=722 bgcolor=#d6d6d6
| 485722 ||  || — || November 25, 2006 || Mount Lemmon || Mount Lemmon Survey || — || align=right | 2.5 km || 
|-id=723 bgcolor=#E9E9E9
| 485723 ||  || — || May 22, 2010 || WISE || WISE || — || align=right | 3.1 km || 
|-id=724 bgcolor=#E9E9E9
| 485724 ||  || — || April 4, 2008 || Mount Lemmon || Mount Lemmon Survey || — || align=right | 2.0 km || 
|-id=725 bgcolor=#E9E9E9
| 485725 ||  || — || January 20, 2012 || Kitt Peak || Spacewatch || MRX || align=right | 1.0 km || 
|-id=726 bgcolor=#E9E9E9
| 485726 ||  || — || July 12, 2009 || Kitt Peak || Spacewatch || — || align=right | 3.1 km || 
|-id=727 bgcolor=#d6d6d6
| 485727 ||  || — || January 21, 2012 || Kitt Peak || Spacewatch || — || align=right | 3.0 km || 
|-id=728 bgcolor=#d6d6d6
| 485728 ||  || — || January 21, 2012 || Haleakala || Pan-STARRS || — || align=right | 2.7 km || 
|-id=729 bgcolor=#E9E9E9
| 485729 ||  || — || December 27, 2011 || Kitt Peak || Spacewatch || — || align=right | 1.5 km || 
|-id=730 bgcolor=#E9E9E9
| 485730 ||  || — || January 2, 2012 || Mount Lemmon || Mount Lemmon Survey || EUN || align=right | 1.2 km || 
|-id=731 bgcolor=#d6d6d6
| 485731 ||  || — || January 25, 2012 || Catalina || CSS || — || align=right | 3.6 km || 
|-id=732 bgcolor=#d6d6d6
| 485732 ||  || — || April 16, 2008 || Mount Lemmon || Mount Lemmon Survey || — || align=right | 2.6 km || 
|-id=733 bgcolor=#d6d6d6
| 485733 ||  || — || January 21, 2012 || Kitt Peak || Spacewatch || — || align=right | 2.3 km || 
|-id=734 bgcolor=#d6d6d6
| 485734 ||  || — || January 21, 2012 || Haleakala || Pan-STARRS || — || align=right | 3.1 km || 
|-id=735 bgcolor=#E9E9E9
| 485735 ||  || — || January 2, 2012 || Kitt Peak || Spacewatch || GEF || align=right | 1.1 km || 
|-id=736 bgcolor=#d6d6d6
| 485736 ||  || — || November 26, 2011 || Mount Lemmon || Mount Lemmon Survey || — || align=right | 1.6 km || 
|-id=737 bgcolor=#E9E9E9
| 485737 ||  || — || January 4, 2012 || Mount Lemmon || Mount Lemmon Survey || — || align=right | 1.8 km || 
|-id=738 bgcolor=#E9E9E9
| 485738 ||  || — || December 24, 2011 || Mount Lemmon || Mount Lemmon Survey || — || align=right | 2.0 km || 
|-id=739 bgcolor=#fefefe
| 485739 ||  || — || January 25, 2012 || Haleakala || Pan-STARRS || H || align=right data-sort-value="0.56" | 560 m || 
|-id=740 bgcolor=#E9E9E9
| 485740 ||  || — || January 19, 2012 || Catalina || CSS || — || align=right | 2.0 km || 
|-id=741 bgcolor=#d6d6d6
| 485741 ||  || — || September 16, 2009 || Mount Lemmon || Mount Lemmon Survey || — || align=right | 3.1 km || 
|-id=742 bgcolor=#E9E9E9
| 485742 ||  || — || January 18, 2012 || Kitt Peak || Spacewatch || — || align=right | 1.9 km || 
|-id=743 bgcolor=#d6d6d6
| 485743 ||  || — || October 29, 2010 || Catalina || CSS || EOS || align=right | 1.8 km || 
|-id=744 bgcolor=#d6d6d6
| 485744 ||  || — || January 27, 2012 || Mount Lemmon || Mount Lemmon Survey || EOS || align=right | 1.5 km || 
|-id=745 bgcolor=#d6d6d6
| 485745 ||  || — || December 26, 2011 || Kitt Peak || Spacewatch || — || align=right | 2.0 km || 
|-id=746 bgcolor=#d6d6d6
| 485746 ||  || — || January 27, 2012 || Kitt Peak || Spacewatch || — || align=right | 2.5 km || 
|-id=747 bgcolor=#d6d6d6
| 485747 ||  || — || January 19, 2012 || Haleakala || Pan-STARRS || — || align=right | 3.9 km || 
|-id=748 bgcolor=#d6d6d6
| 485748 ||  || — || January 21, 2012 || Haleakala || Pan-STARRS || — || align=right | 4.0 km || 
|-id=749 bgcolor=#d6d6d6
| 485749 ||  || — || January 2, 2012 || Kitt Peak || Spacewatch || — || align=right | 2.7 km || 
|-id=750 bgcolor=#d6d6d6
| 485750 ||  || — || January 27, 2012 || Mount Lemmon || Mount Lemmon Survey || — || align=right | 3.1 km || 
|-id=751 bgcolor=#d6d6d6
| 485751 ||  || — || January 18, 1996 || Kitt Peak || Spacewatch || — || align=right | 2.5 km || 
|-id=752 bgcolor=#d6d6d6
| 485752 ||  || — || November 13, 2010 || Mount Lemmon || Mount Lemmon Survey || — || align=right | 2.9 km || 
|-id=753 bgcolor=#fefefe
| 485753 ||  || — || January 22, 2012 || Haleakala || Pan-STARRS || H || align=right data-sort-value="0.73" | 730 m || 
|-id=754 bgcolor=#d6d6d6
| 485754 ||  || — || January 21, 2012 || Haleakala || Pan-STARRS || — || align=right | 3.0 km || 
|-id=755 bgcolor=#E9E9E9
| 485755 ||  || — || January 29, 2012 || Mount Lemmon || Mount Lemmon Survey || — || align=right | 2.0 km || 
|-id=756 bgcolor=#fefefe
| 485756 ||  || — || February 21, 2007 || Mount Lemmon || Mount Lemmon Survey || H || align=right data-sort-value="0.46" | 460 m || 
|-id=757 bgcolor=#d6d6d6
| 485757 ||  || — || January 20, 2012 || Haleakala || Pan-STARRS || — || align=right | 2.9 km || 
|-id=758 bgcolor=#d6d6d6
| 485758 ||  || — || January 17, 2007 || Mount Lemmon || Mount Lemmon Survey || — || align=right | 2.3 km || 
|-id=759 bgcolor=#E9E9E9
| 485759 ||  || — || December 29, 2011 || Kitt Peak || Spacewatch || — || align=right | 2.1 km || 
|-id=760 bgcolor=#fefefe
| 485760 ||  || — || February 2, 2012 || Catalina || CSS || H || align=right data-sort-value="0.80" | 800 m || 
|-id=761 bgcolor=#E9E9E9
| 485761 ||  || — || February 3, 2012 || Mount Lemmon || Mount Lemmon Survey || — || align=right | 1.9 km || 
|-id=762 bgcolor=#d6d6d6
| 485762 ||  || — || January 19, 2012 || Haleakala || Pan-STARRS || — || align=right | 2.1 km || 
|-id=763 bgcolor=#d6d6d6
| 485763 ||  || — || February 3, 2012 || Haleakala || Pan-STARRS || — || align=right | 2.9 km || 
|-id=764 bgcolor=#d6d6d6
| 485764 ||  || — || February 3, 2012 || Haleakala || Pan-STARRS || EOS || align=right | 2.0 km || 
|-id=765 bgcolor=#d6d6d6
| 485765 ||  || — || February 3, 2012 || Haleakala || Pan-STARRS || — || align=right | 4.1 km || 
|-id=766 bgcolor=#E9E9E9
| 485766 ||  || — || February 3, 2012 || Haleakala || Pan-STARRS || — || align=right | 2.0 km || 
|-id=767 bgcolor=#E9E9E9
| 485767 ||  || — || January 26, 2012 || Kitt Peak || Spacewatch || — || align=right | 2.7 km || 
|-id=768 bgcolor=#d6d6d6
| 485768 ||  || — || January 19, 2012 || Haleakala || Pan-STARRS || — || align=right | 2.0 km || 
|-id=769 bgcolor=#d6d6d6
| 485769 ||  || — || January 17, 2007 || Mount Lemmon || Mount Lemmon Survey || — || align=right | 1.7 km || 
|-id=770 bgcolor=#d6d6d6
| 485770 ||  || — || February 3, 2012 || Haleakala || Pan-STARRS ||  || align=right | 2.0 km || 
|-id=771 bgcolor=#E9E9E9
| 485771 ||  || — || February 2, 2008 || Mount Lemmon || Mount Lemmon Survey || — || align=right | 2.9 km || 
|-id=772 bgcolor=#d6d6d6
| 485772 ||  || — || April 14, 2007 || Kitt Peak || Spacewatch || — || align=right | 2.8 km || 
|-id=773 bgcolor=#d6d6d6
| 485773 ||  || — || January 29, 2012 || Kitt Peak || Spacewatch || — || align=right | 2.4 km || 
|-id=774 bgcolor=#d6d6d6
| 485774 ||  || — || February 3, 2012 || Haleakala || Pan-STARRS || — || align=right | 2.7 km || 
|-id=775 bgcolor=#d6d6d6
| 485775 ||  || — || January 19, 2012 || Kitt Peak || Spacewatch || — || align=right | 2.6 km || 
|-id=776 bgcolor=#d6d6d6
| 485776 ||  || — || January 21, 2012 || Haleakala || Pan-STARRS || EOS || align=right | 2.3 km || 
|-id=777 bgcolor=#d6d6d6
| 485777 ||  || — || January 19, 2012 || Haleakala || Pan-STARRS || — || align=right | 3.2 km || 
|-id=778 bgcolor=#d6d6d6
| 485778 ||  || — || August 25, 2009 || La Sagra || OAM Obs. || — || align=right | 4.1 km || 
|-id=779 bgcolor=#d6d6d6
| 485779 ||  || — || February 1, 2012 || Kitt Peak || Spacewatch || — || align=right | 3.5 km || 
|-id=780 bgcolor=#d6d6d6
| 485780 ||  || — || January 19, 2012 || Haleakala || Pan-STARRS || — || align=right | 3.6 km || 
|-id=781 bgcolor=#FA8072
| 485781 ||  || — || February 20, 2012 || Haleakala || Pan-STARRS || H || align=right data-sort-value="0.67" | 670 m || 
|-id=782 bgcolor=#fefefe
| 485782 ||  || — || February 20, 2012 || Haleakala || Pan-STARRS || H || align=right data-sort-value="0.58" | 580 m || 
|-id=783 bgcolor=#d6d6d6
| 485783 ||  || — || February 18, 2012 || La Sagra || OAM Obs. || — || align=right | 4.1 km || 
|-id=784 bgcolor=#d6d6d6
| 485784 ||  || — || January 21, 2012 || Haleakala || Pan-STARRS || — || align=right | 2.9 km || 
|-id=785 bgcolor=#d6d6d6
| 485785 ||  || — || September 15, 2010 || La Sagra || OAM Obs. || — || align=right | 3.8 km || 
|-id=786 bgcolor=#d6d6d6
| 485786 ||  || — || January 30, 2012 || Kitt Peak || Spacewatch || — || align=right | 2.7 km || 
|-id=787 bgcolor=#d6d6d6
| 485787 ||  || — || January 19, 2012 || Haleakala || Pan-STARRS || — || align=right | 3.1 km || 
|-id=788 bgcolor=#d6d6d6
| 485788 ||  || — || February 21, 2012 || Kitt Peak || Spacewatch || EOS || align=right | 2.0 km || 
|-id=789 bgcolor=#d6d6d6
| 485789 ||  || — || January 27, 2012 || Mount Lemmon || Mount Lemmon Survey || — || align=right | 2.4 km || 
|-id=790 bgcolor=#d6d6d6
| 485790 ||  || — || February 13, 2012 || Kitt Peak || Spacewatch || — || align=right | 2.8 km || 
|-id=791 bgcolor=#d6d6d6
| 485791 ||  || — || September 25, 2009 || Catalina || CSS || — || align=right | 3.2 km || 
|-id=792 bgcolor=#d6d6d6
| 485792 ||  || — || February 20, 2012 || Haleakala || Pan-STARRS || — || align=right | 4.1 km || 
|-id=793 bgcolor=#d6d6d6
| 485793 ||  || — || February 21, 2012 || Kitt Peak || Spacewatch || — || align=right | 3.1 km || 
|-id=794 bgcolor=#d6d6d6
| 485794 ||  || — || February 21, 2012 || Kitt Peak || Spacewatch || — || align=right | 2.7 km || 
|-id=795 bgcolor=#fefefe
| 485795 ||  || — || September 29, 2005 || Kitt Peak || Spacewatch || H || align=right data-sort-value="0.61" | 610 m || 
|-id=796 bgcolor=#d6d6d6
| 485796 ||  || — || April 24, 2007 || Mount Lemmon || Mount Lemmon Survey || — || align=right | 2.7 km || 
|-id=797 bgcolor=#d6d6d6
| 485797 ||  || — || November 1, 2005 || Mount Lemmon || Mount Lemmon Survey || — || align=right | 1.8 km || 
|-id=798 bgcolor=#d6d6d6
| 485798 ||  || — || February 22, 2012 || Kitt Peak || Spacewatch || — || align=right | 3.9 km || 
|-id=799 bgcolor=#d6d6d6
| 485799 ||  || — || February 20, 2012 || Haleakala || Pan-STARRS || EOS || align=right | 2.2 km || 
|-id=800 bgcolor=#d6d6d6
| 485800 ||  || — || January 14, 2010 || WISE || WISE || — || align=right | 3.4 km || 
|}

485801–485900 

|-bgcolor=#d6d6d6
| 485801 ||  || — || December 6, 2011 || Haleakala || Pan-STARRS || EOS || align=right | 2.0 km || 
|-id=802 bgcolor=#d6d6d6
| 485802 ||  || — || February 24, 2012 || Kitt Peak || Spacewatch || — || align=right | 2.9 km || 
|-id=803 bgcolor=#d6d6d6
| 485803 ||  || — || February 24, 2012 || Kitt Peak || Spacewatch || — || align=right | 3.2 km || 
|-id=804 bgcolor=#d6d6d6
| 485804 ||  || — || February 19, 2012 || Kitt Peak || Spacewatch || critical || align=right | 2.7 km || 
|-id=805 bgcolor=#d6d6d6
| 485805 ||  || — || October 1, 2010 || La Sagra || OAM Obs. || — || align=right | 2.8 km || 
|-id=806 bgcolor=#d6d6d6
| 485806 ||  || — || February 25, 2012 || Kitt Peak || Spacewatch || KOR || align=right | 1.4 km || 
|-id=807 bgcolor=#d6d6d6
| 485807 ||  || — || February 16, 2012 || Haleakala || Pan-STARRS || — || align=right | 2.4 km || 
|-id=808 bgcolor=#E9E9E9
| 485808 ||  || — || December 15, 2006 || Kitt Peak || Spacewatch || — || align=right | 2.2 km || 
|-id=809 bgcolor=#d6d6d6
| 485809 ||  || — || December 4, 2005 || Kitt Peak || Spacewatch || — || align=right | 2.7 km || 
|-id=810 bgcolor=#d6d6d6
| 485810 ||  || — || January 19, 2012 || Haleakala || Pan-STARRS || — || align=right | 3.6 km || 
|-id=811 bgcolor=#d6d6d6
| 485811 ||  || — || July 3, 2003 || Kitt Peak || Spacewatch || — || align=right | 3.6 km || 
|-id=812 bgcolor=#d6d6d6
| 485812 ||  || — || August 15, 2009 || La Sagra || OAM Obs. || — || align=right | 3.4 km || 
|-id=813 bgcolor=#d6d6d6
| 485813 ||  || — || February 25, 2012 || Kitt Peak || Spacewatch || — || align=right | 3.1 km || 
|-id=814 bgcolor=#d6d6d6
| 485814 ||  || — || January 19, 2012 || Haleakala || Pan-STARRS || — || align=right | 3.8 km || 
|-id=815 bgcolor=#d6d6d6
| 485815 ||  || — || April 25, 2007 || Mount Lemmon || Mount Lemmon Survey || — || align=right | 2.9 km || 
|-id=816 bgcolor=#d6d6d6
| 485816 ||  || — || September 16, 2009 || Mount Lemmon || Mount Lemmon Survey || EOS || align=right | 2.1 km || 
|-id=817 bgcolor=#d6d6d6
| 485817 ||  || — || July 21, 2010 || WISE || WISE || THB || align=right | 3.3 km || 
|-id=818 bgcolor=#d6d6d6
| 485818 ||  || — || September 22, 2009 || Kitt Peak || Spacewatch || EOS || align=right | 1.7 km || 
|-id=819 bgcolor=#d6d6d6
| 485819 ||  || — || December 25, 2011 || Mount Lemmon || Mount Lemmon Survey || — || align=right | 3.1 km || 
|-id=820 bgcolor=#d6d6d6
| 485820 ||  || — || February 13, 2012 || Haleakala || Pan-STARRS || — || align=right | 3.5 km || 
|-id=821 bgcolor=#d6d6d6
| 485821 ||  || — || December 27, 2011 || Mount Lemmon || Mount Lemmon Survey || EOS || align=right | 1.9 km || 
|-id=822 bgcolor=#d6d6d6
| 485822 ||  || — || January 19, 2012 || Haleakala || Pan-STARRS || — || align=right | 3.4 km || 
|-id=823 bgcolor=#FFC2E0
| 485823 ||  || — || February 28, 2012 || Socorro || LINEAR || APO || align=right data-sort-value="0.28" | 280 m || 
|-id=824 bgcolor=#d6d6d6
| 485824 ||  || — || January 26, 2012 || Mount Lemmon || Mount Lemmon Survey || EOS || align=right | 1.4 km || 
|-id=825 bgcolor=#d6d6d6
| 485825 ||  || — || February 16, 2012 || Haleakala || Pan-STARRS || EOS || align=right | 2.0 km || 
|-id=826 bgcolor=#d6d6d6
| 485826 ||  || — || February 24, 2012 || Mount Lemmon || Mount Lemmon Survey || — || align=right | 2.0 km || 
|-id=827 bgcolor=#d6d6d6
| 485827 ||  || — || February 1, 2012 || Kitt Peak || Spacewatch || — || align=right | 2.3 km || 
|-id=828 bgcolor=#fefefe
| 485828 ||  || — || December 4, 2011 || Haleakala || Pan-STARRS || H || align=right data-sort-value="0.72" | 720 m || 
|-id=829 bgcolor=#d6d6d6
| 485829 ||  || — || January 19, 2012 || Haleakala || Pan-STARRS || — || align=right | 2.4 km || 
|-id=830 bgcolor=#d6d6d6
| 485830 ||  || — || December 10, 2005 || Kitt Peak || Spacewatch || — || align=right | 2.7 km || 
|-id=831 bgcolor=#E9E9E9
| 485831 ||  || — || January 19, 2012 || Haleakala || Pan-STARRS || DOR || align=right | 2.7 km || 
|-id=832 bgcolor=#d6d6d6
| 485832 ||  || — || December 25, 2011 || Mount Lemmon || Mount Lemmon Survey || — || align=right | 2.2 km || 
|-id=833 bgcolor=#fefefe
| 485833 ||  || — || February 14, 2012 || Haleakala || Pan-STARRS || H || align=right data-sort-value="0.60" | 600 m || 
|-id=834 bgcolor=#d6d6d6
| 485834 ||  || — || February 27, 2012 || Haleakala || Pan-STARRS || EOS || align=right | 1.8 km || 
|-id=835 bgcolor=#d6d6d6
| 485835 ||  || — || November 4, 2010 || Mount Lemmon || Mount Lemmon Survey || — || align=right | 2.5 km || 
|-id=836 bgcolor=#d6d6d6
| 485836 ||  || — || February 23, 2012 || Mount Lemmon || Mount Lemmon Survey || — || align=right | 2.6 km || 
|-id=837 bgcolor=#d6d6d6
| 485837 ||  || — || January 19, 2012 || Haleakala || Pan-STARRS || — || align=right | 2.9 km || 
|-id=838 bgcolor=#d6d6d6
| 485838 ||  || — || February 16, 2012 || Haleakala || Pan-STARRS || HYG || align=right | 2.5 km || 
|-id=839 bgcolor=#fefefe
| 485839 ||  || — || February 24, 2012 || Haleakala || Pan-STARRS || H || align=right data-sort-value="0.54" | 540 m || 
|-id=840 bgcolor=#d6d6d6
| 485840 ||  || — || December 6, 2011 || Haleakala || Pan-STARRS || — || align=right | 3.2 km || 
|-id=841 bgcolor=#fefefe
| 485841 ||  || — || February 25, 2012 || Catalina || CSS || H || align=right data-sort-value="0.73" | 730 m || 
|-id=842 bgcolor=#d6d6d6
| 485842 ||  || — || October 28, 2011 || Kitt Peak || Spacewatch || — || align=right | 3.9 km || 
|-id=843 bgcolor=#fefefe
| 485843 ||  || — || March 10, 2007 || Mount Lemmon || Mount Lemmon Survey || H || align=right data-sort-value="0.75" | 750 m || 
|-id=844 bgcolor=#d6d6d6
| 485844 ||  || — || January 7, 2006 || Mount Lemmon || Mount Lemmon Survey || THM || align=right | 2.0 km || 
|-id=845 bgcolor=#d6d6d6
| 485845 ||  || — || March 14, 2007 || Mount Lemmon || Mount Lemmon Survey || — || align=right | 2.1 km || 
|-id=846 bgcolor=#d6d6d6
| 485846 ||  || — || February 3, 2012 || Haleakala || Pan-STARRS || — || align=right | 2.7 km || 
|-id=847 bgcolor=#d6d6d6
| 485847 ||  || — || September 18, 2009 || Mount Lemmon || Mount Lemmon Survey || — || align=right | 2.5 km || 
|-id=848 bgcolor=#fefefe
| 485848 ||  || — || February 15, 2012 || Haleakala || Pan-STARRS || H || align=right data-sort-value="0.59" | 590 m || 
|-id=849 bgcolor=#d6d6d6
| 485849 ||  || — || November 27, 2010 || Mount Lemmon || Mount Lemmon Survey || — || align=right | 2.0 km || 
|-id=850 bgcolor=#fefefe
| 485850 ||  || — || February 18, 2012 || Catalina || CSS || H || align=right data-sort-value="0.67" | 670 m || 
|-id=851 bgcolor=#FA8072
| 485851 ||  || — || March 13, 2012 || Haleakala || Pan-STARRS || H || align=right data-sort-value="0.72" | 720 m || 
|-id=852 bgcolor=#fefefe
| 485852 ||  || — || March 14, 2012 || Haleakala || Pan-STARRS || H || align=right data-sort-value="0.69" | 690 m || 
|-id=853 bgcolor=#fefefe
| 485853 ||  || — || February 18, 2012 || Catalina || CSS || H || align=right data-sort-value="0.46" | 460 m || 
|-id=854 bgcolor=#d6d6d6
| 485854 ||  || — || February 26, 2007 || Mount Lemmon || Mount Lemmon Survey || — || align=right | 2.3 km || 
|-id=855 bgcolor=#d6d6d6
| 485855 ||  || — || March 13, 2012 || Mount Lemmon || Mount Lemmon Survey || — || align=right | 2.2 km || 
|-id=856 bgcolor=#d6d6d6
| 485856 ||  || — || February 4, 2006 || Catalina || CSS || Tj (2.93) || align=right | 4.9 km || 
|-id=857 bgcolor=#fefefe
| 485857 ||  || — || March 15, 2007 || Mount Lemmon || Mount Lemmon Survey || H || align=right data-sort-value="0.74" | 740 m || 
|-id=858 bgcolor=#d6d6d6
| 485858 ||  || — || August 16, 2009 || Kitt Peak || Spacewatch || — || align=right | 3.1 km || 
|-id=859 bgcolor=#d6d6d6
| 485859 ||  || — || April 22, 2007 || Kitt Peak || Spacewatch || — || align=right | 1.4 km || 
|-id=860 bgcolor=#FA8072
| 485860 ||  || — || January 25, 2012 || Catalina || CSS || H || align=right data-sort-value="0.78" | 780 m || 
|-id=861 bgcolor=#d6d6d6
| 485861 ||  || — || January 19, 2012 || Haleakala || Pan-STARRS || — || align=right | 3.0 km || 
|-id=862 bgcolor=#d6d6d6
| 485862 ||  || — || August 27, 2009 || Kitt Peak || Spacewatch || — || align=right | 2.1 km || 
|-id=863 bgcolor=#d6d6d6
| 485863 ||  || — || February 13, 2012 || Haleakala || Pan-STARRS || — || align=right | 2.5 km || 
|-id=864 bgcolor=#d6d6d6
| 485864 ||  || — || March 15, 2012 || Mount Lemmon || Mount Lemmon Survey || — || align=right | 2.2 km || 
|-id=865 bgcolor=#fefefe
| 485865 ||  || — || February 28, 2012 || Haleakala || Pan-STARRS || H || align=right data-sort-value="0.64" | 640 m || 
|-id=866 bgcolor=#d6d6d6
| 485866 ||  || — || February 4, 2006 || Kitt Peak || Spacewatch || — || align=right | 2.6 km || 
|-id=867 bgcolor=#d6d6d6
| 485867 ||  || — || April 14, 2007 || Mount Lemmon || Mount Lemmon Survey || — || align=right | 1.8 km || 
|-id=868 bgcolor=#d6d6d6
| 485868 ||  || — || January 26, 2006 || Mount Lemmon || Mount Lemmon Survey || — || align=right | 2.4 km || 
|-id=869 bgcolor=#d6d6d6
| 485869 ||  || — || January 23, 2006 || Kitt Peak || Spacewatch || — || align=right | 2.2 km || 
|-id=870 bgcolor=#d6d6d6
| 485870 ||  || — || March 26, 2001 || Kitt Peak || Spacewatch || THM || align=right | 2.1 km || 
|-id=871 bgcolor=#d6d6d6
| 485871 ||  || — || October 18, 2003 || Kitt Peak || Spacewatch || VER || align=right | 2.8 km || 
|-id=872 bgcolor=#d6d6d6
| 485872 ||  || — || February 28, 2012 || Haleakala || Pan-STARRS || — || align=right | 2.5 km || 
|-id=873 bgcolor=#d6d6d6
| 485873 ||  || — || January 31, 2006 || Mount Lemmon || Mount Lemmon Survey || — || align=right | 2.5 km || 
|-id=874 bgcolor=#d6d6d6
| 485874 ||  || — || February 28, 2012 || Haleakala || Pan-STARRS || — || align=right | 2.4 km || 
|-id=875 bgcolor=#d6d6d6
| 485875 ||  || — || March 13, 2012 || Mount Lemmon || Mount Lemmon Survey || EOS || align=right | 1.8 km || 
|-id=876 bgcolor=#d6d6d6
| 485876 ||  || — || April 23, 2001 || Socorro || LINEAR || — || align=right | 2.8 km || 
|-id=877 bgcolor=#E9E9E9
| 485877 ||  || — || March 31, 2003 || Kitt Peak || Spacewatch || — || align=right | 2.4 km || 
|-id=878 bgcolor=#d6d6d6
| 485878 ||  || — || January 31, 2006 || Kitt Peak || Spacewatch || HYG || align=right | 2.4 km || 
|-id=879 bgcolor=#d6d6d6
| 485879 ||  || — || February 21, 2006 || Catalina || CSS || — || align=right | 3.7 km || 
|-id=880 bgcolor=#d6d6d6
| 485880 ||  || — || September 22, 2004 || Kitt Peak || Spacewatch || — || align=right | 2.7 km || 
|-id=881 bgcolor=#d6d6d6
| 485881 ||  || — || February 28, 2012 || Haleakala || Pan-STARRS || — || align=right | 3.1 km || 
|-id=882 bgcolor=#FFC2E0
| 485882 ||  || — || March 22, 2012 || Catalina || CSS || APO +1km || align=right data-sort-value="0.78" | 780 m || 
|-id=883 bgcolor=#d6d6d6
| 485883 ||  || — || October 17, 2009 || Mount Lemmon || Mount Lemmon Survey || — || align=right | 2.9 km || 
|-id=884 bgcolor=#d6d6d6
| 485884 ||  || — || September 7, 2008 || Mount Lemmon || Mount Lemmon Survey || — || align=right | 2.8 km || 
|-id=885 bgcolor=#d6d6d6
| 485885 ||  || — || March 11, 1996 || Kitt Peak || Spacewatch || — || align=right | 2.1 km || 
|-id=886 bgcolor=#d6d6d6
| 485886 ||  || — || March 4, 2012 || Kitt Peak || Spacewatch || EOS || align=right | 1.5 km || 
|-id=887 bgcolor=#d6d6d6
| 485887 ||  || — || February 27, 2012 || Kitt Peak || Spacewatch || — || align=right | 2.6 km || 
|-id=888 bgcolor=#d6d6d6
| 485888 ||  || — || September 27, 2009 || Kitt Peak || Spacewatch || — || align=right | 2.9 km || 
|-id=889 bgcolor=#fefefe
| 485889 ||  || — || October 16, 2010 || Siding Spring || SSS || H || align=right data-sort-value="0.90" | 900 m || 
|-id=890 bgcolor=#d6d6d6
| 485890 ||  || — || March 13, 2012 || Mount Lemmon || Mount Lemmon Survey || — || align=right | 2.4 km || 
|-id=891 bgcolor=#d6d6d6
| 485891 ||  || — || February 26, 2012 || Haleakala || Pan-STARRS || — || align=right | 2.5 km || 
|-id=892 bgcolor=#d6d6d6
| 485892 ||  || — || January 23, 2006 || Kitt Peak || Spacewatch || THM || align=right | 1.7 km || 
|-id=893 bgcolor=#d6d6d6
| 485893 ||  || — || April 24, 2007 || Kitt Peak || Spacewatch || — || align=right | 2.5 km || 
|-id=894 bgcolor=#d6d6d6
| 485894 ||  || — || December 6, 2011 || Haleakala || Pan-STARRS || LIX || align=right | 3.6 km || 
|-id=895 bgcolor=#fefefe
| 485895 ||  || — || February 2, 2009 || Socorro || LINEAR || H || align=right data-sort-value="0.78" | 780 m || 
|-id=896 bgcolor=#d6d6d6
| 485896 ||  || — || March 25, 2012 || Mount Lemmon || Mount Lemmon Survey || — || align=right | 2.4 km || 
|-id=897 bgcolor=#d6d6d6
| 485897 ||  || — || December 6, 2011 || Haleakala || Pan-STARRS || — || align=right | 2.6 km || 
|-id=898 bgcolor=#d6d6d6
| 485898 ||  || — || March 13, 2012 || Kitt Peak || Spacewatch || — || align=right | 2.4 km || 
|-id=899 bgcolor=#fefefe
| 485899 ||  || — || September 30, 2005 || Mount Lemmon || Mount Lemmon Survey || H || align=right data-sort-value="0.65" | 650 m || 
|-id=900 bgcolor=#fefefe
| 485900 ||  || — || January 29, 2004 || Socorro || LINEAR || H || align=right data-sort-value="0.74" | 740 m || 
|}

485901–486000 

|-bgcolor=#d6d6d6
| 485901 ||  || — || February 1, 2006 || Catalina || CSS || — || align=right | 3.0 km || 
|-id=902 bgcolor=#d6d6d6
| 485902 ||  || — || March 29, 2012 || Haleakala || Pan-STARRS || — || align=right | 3.1 km || 
|-id=903 bgcolor=#d6d6d6
| 485903 ||  || — || August 18, 2009 || Kitt Peak || Spacewatch || — || align=right | 3.3 km || 
|-id=904 bgcolor=#d6d6d6
| 485904 ||  || — || February 3, 2006 || Mount Lemmon || Mount Lemmon Survey || EMA || align=right | 3.3 km || 
|-id=905 bgcolor=#d6d6d6
| 485905 ||  || — || January 5, 2006 || Kitt Peak || Spacewatch || — || align=right | 2.7 km || 
|-id=906 bgcolor=#d6d6d6
| 485906 ||  || — || March 14, 2012 || Kitt Peak || Spacewatch || — || align=right | 2.8 km || 
|-id=907 bgcolor=#fefefe
| 485907 ||  || — || February 19, 2004 || Socorro || LINEAR || H || align=right data-sort-value="0.70" | 700 m || 
|-id=908 bgcolor=#fefefe
| 485908 ||  || — || December 6, 2011 || Haleakala || Pan-STARRS || H || align=right data-sort-value="0.64" | 640 m || 
|-id=909 bgcolor=#d6d6d6
| 485909 ||  || — || November 8, 2009 || Mount Lemmon || Mount Lemmon Survey || — || align=right | 2.9 km || 
|-id=910 bgcolor=#fefefe
| 485910 ||  || — || March 27, 2012 || Mount Lemmon || Mount Lemmon Survey || H || align=right data-sort-value="0.78" | 780 m || 
|-id=911 bgcolor=#fefefe
| 485911 ||  || — || October 5, 2005 || Mount Lemmon || Mount Lemmon Survey || H || align=right data-sort-value="0.64" | 640 m || 
|-id=912 bgcolor=#d6d6d6
| 485912 ||  || — || January 5, 2012 || Haleakala || Pan-STARRS || EOS || align=right | 1.9 km || 
|-id=913 bgcolor=#d6d6d6
| 485913 ||  || — || March 17, 2012 || Kitt Peak || Spacewatch || (1118) || align=right | 3.6 km || 
|-id=914 bgcolor=#d6d6d6
| 485914 ||  || — || December 13, 2010 || Mauna Kea || M. Micheli || — || align=right | 2.4 km || 
|-id=915 bgcolor=#d6d6d6
| 485915 ||  || — || January 30, 2012 || Mount Lemmon || Mount Lemmon Survey || — || align=right | 3.3 km || 
|-id=916 bgcolor=#d6d6d6
| 485916 ||  || — || January 14, 2011 || Kitt Peak || Spacewatch || — || align=right | 2.9 km || 
|-id=917 bgcolor=#d6d6d6
| 485917 ||  || — || April 15, 2012 || Haleakala || Pan-STARRS || Tj (2.99) || align=right | 4.4 km || 
|-id=918 bgcolor=#fefefe
| 485918 ||  || — || April 15, 2012 || Haleakala || Pan-STARRS || H || align=right data-sort-value="0.79" | 790 m || 
|-id=919 bgcolor=#d6d6d6
| 485919 ||  || — || February 27, 2006 || Catalina || CSS || — || align=right | 3.5 km || 
|-id=920 bgcolor=#d6d6d6
| 485920 ||  || — || March 9, 2007 || Mount Lemmon || Mount Lemmon Survey || — || align=right | 1.8 km || 
|-id=921 bgcolor=#d6d6d6
| 485921 ||  || — || March 17, 2012 || Kitt Peak || Spacewatch || EOS || align=right | 1.9 km || 
|-id=922 bgcolor=#d6d6d6
| 485922 ||  || — || March 28, 2012 || Kitt Peak || Spacewatch || — || align=right | 2.7 km || 
|-id=923 bgcolor=#d6d6d6
| 485923 ||  || — || December 30, 2005 || Kitt Peak || Spacewatch || — || align=right | 2.2 km || 
|-id=924 bgcolor=#d6d6d6
| 485924 ||  || — || February 23, 2012 || Mount Lemmon || Mount Lemmon Survey || — || align=right | 3.0 km || 
|-id=925 bgcolor=#d6d6d6
| 485925 ||  || — || January 6, 2012 || Haleakala || Pan-STARRS || — || align=right | 3.1 km || 
|-id=926 bgcolor=#d6d6d6
| 485926 ||  || — || September 29, 2008 || Mount Lemmon || Mount Lemmon Survey || — || align=right | 2.2 km || 
|-id=927 bgcolor=#d6d6d6
| 485927 ||  || — || March 27, 2012 || Haleakala || Pan-STARRS || — || align=right | 3.8 km || 
|-id=928 bgcolor=#d6d6d6
| 485928 ||  || — || January 30, 2012 || Haleakala || Pan-STARRS || EOS || align=right | 2.2 km || 
|-id=929 bgcolor=#fefefe
| 485929 ||  || — || September 17, 2010 || Catalina || CSS || H || align=right data-sort-value="0.78" | 780 m || 
|-id=930 bgcolor=#d6d6d6
| 485930 ||  || — || January 13, 2011 || Kitt Peak || Spacewatch || — || align=right | 2.8 km || 
|-id=931 bgcolor=#d6d6d6
| 485931 ||  || — || March 29, 2012 || Haleakala || Pan-STARRS || — || align=right | 2.3 km || 
|-id=932 bgcolor=#d6d6d6
| 485932 ||  || — || April 17, 2012 || Kitt Peak || Spacewatch || — || align=right | 2.5 km || 
|-id=933 bgcolor=#d6d6d6
| 485933 ||  || — || November 8, 2009 || Kitt Peak || Spacewatch || — || align=right | 3.8 km || 
|-id=934 bgcolor=#d6d6d6
| 485934 ||  || — || December 10, 2010 || Mount Lemmon || Mount Lemmon Survey || — || align=right | 2.8 km || 
|-id=935 bgcolor=#d6d6d6
| 485935 ||  || — || April 10, 2012 || Kitt Peak || Spacewatch || — || align=right | 3.2 km || 
|-id=936 bgcolor=#d6d6d6
| 485936 ||  || — || January 7, 2006 || Mount Lemmon || Mount Lemmon Survey || — || align=right | 3.1 km || 
|-id=937 bgcolor=#fefefe
| 485937 ||  || — || April 12, 2004 || Anderson Mesa || LONEOS || H || align=right data-sort-value="0.52" | 520 m || 
|-id=938 bgcolor=#FA8072
| 485938 ||  || — || April 24, 2012 || Haleakala || Pan-STARRS || — || align=right data-sort-value="0.34" | 340 m || 
|-id=939 bgcolor=#fefefe
| 485939 ||  || — || April 26, 2012 || Haleakala || Pan-STARRS || H || align=right data-sort-value="0.67" | 670 m || 
|-id=940 bgcolor=#fefefe
| 485940 ||  || — || April 27, 2012 || Haleakala || Pan-STARRS || H || align=right data-sort-value="0.70" | 700 m || 
|-id=941 bgcolor=#d6d6d6
| 485941 ||  || — || April 15, 2012 || Haleakala || Pan-STARRS || — || align=right | 2.7 km || 
|-id=942 bgcolor=#d6d6d6
| 485942 ||  || — || March 4, 2006 || Kitt Peak || Spacewatch || EOS || align=right | 1.7 km || 
|-id=943 bgcolor=#d6d6d6
| 485943 ||  || — || March 15, 2012 || Haleakala || Pan-STARRS || — || align=right | 3.5 km || 
|-id=944 bgcolor=#d6d6d6
| 485944 ||  || — || January 23, 2006 || Kitt Peak || Spacewatch || — || align=right | 2.8 km || 
|-id=945 bgcolor=#d6d6d6
| 485945 ||  || — || March 14, 2012 || Kitt Peak || Spacewatch || — || align=right | 3.0 km || 
|-id=946 bgcolor=#d6d6d6
| 485946 ||  || — || January 30, 2011 || Haleakala || Pan-STARRS || THM || align=right | 2.3 km || 
|-id=947 bgcolor=#d6d6d6
| 485947 ||  || — || April 20, 2012 || Mount Lemmon || Mount Lemmon Survey || — || align=right | 2.6 km || 
|-id=948 bgcolor=#d6d6d6
| 485948 ||  || — || February 1, 2006 || Mount Lemmon || Mount Lemmon Survey || EOS || align=right | 1.6 km || 
|-id=949 bgcolor=#d6d6d6
| 485949 ||  || — || April 21, 2012 || Mount Lemmon || Mount Lemmon Survey || — || align=right | 3.1 km || 
|-id=950 bgcolor=#d6d6d6
| 485950 ||  || — || April 24, 2012 || Haleakala || Pan-STARRS || — || align=right | 3.0 km || 
|-id=951 bgcolor=#d6d6d6
| 485951 ||  || — || April 24, 2012 || Haleakala || Pan-STARRS || — || align=right | 3.7 km || 
|-id=952 bgcolor=#d6d6d6
| 485952 ||  || — || January 30, 2011 || Haleakala || Pan-STARRS || — || align=right | 2.8 km || 
|-id=953 bgcolor=#d6d6d6
| 485953 ||  || — || November 23, 2009 || Kitt Peak || Spacewatch || — || align=right | 3.2 km || 
|-id=954 bgcolor=#fefefe
| 485954 ||  || — || January 5, 2012 || Haleakala || Pan-STARRS || H || align=right data-sort-value="0.56" | 560 m || 
|-id=955 bgcolor=#d6d6d6
| 485955 ||  || — || April 21, 2012 || Haleakala || Pan-STARRS || — || align=right | 2.8 km || 
|-id=956 bgcolor=#d6d6d6
| 485956 ||  || — || February 25, 2012 || Mount Lemmon || Mount Lemmon Survey || — || align=right | 2.6 km || 
|-id=957 bgcolor=#d6d6d6
| 485957 ||  || — || April 1, 2012 || Mount Lemmon || Mount Lemmon Survey || — || align=right | 2.6 km || 
|-id=958 bgcolor=#d6d6d6
| 485958 ||  || — || April 16, 2012 || Haleakala || Pan-STARRS || — || align=right | 2.8 km || 
|-id=959 bgcolor=#d6d6d6
| 485959 ||  || — || May 25, 2007 || Mount Lemmon || Mount Lemmon Survey || — || align=right | 3.2 km || 
|-id=960 bgcolor=#d6d6d6
| 485960 ||  || — || January 30, 2011 || Haleakala || Pan-STARRS || — || align=right | 3.0 km || 
|-id=961 bgcolor=#d6d6d6
| 485961 ||  || — || March 4, 2012 || Mount Lemmon || Mount Lemmon Survey || — || align=right | 2.6 km || 
|-id=962 bgcolor=#d6d6d6
| 485962 ||  || — || January 23, 2006 || Kitt Peak || Spacewatch || — || align=right | 2.8 km || 
|-id=963 bgcolor=#d6d6d6
| 485963 ||  || — || January 24, 2006 || Anderson Mesa || LONEOS || — || align=right | 3.1 km || 
|-id=964 bgcolor=#d6d6d6
| 485964 ||  || — || April 21, 2012 || Haleakala || Pan-STARRS || — || align=right | 2.7 km || 
|-id=965 bgcolor=#d6d6d6
| 485965 ||  || — || April 19, 2012 || Catalina || CSS || — || align=right | 3.2 km || 
|-id=966 bgcolor=#d6d6d6
| 485966 ||  || — || March 30, 2012 || Mount Lemmon || Mount Lemmon Survey || — || align=right | 2.5 km || 
|-id=967 bgcolor=#d6d6d6
| 485967 ||  || — || September 22, 2009 || Kitt Peak || Spacewatch || — || align=right | 2.5 km || 
|-id=968 bgcolor=#d6d6d6
| 485968 ||  || — || April 27, 2012 || Haleakala || Pan-STARRS || HYG || align=right | 2.3 km || 
|-id=969 bgcolor=#d6d6d6
| 485969 ||  || — || October 27, 2009 || Mount Lemmon || Mount Lemmon Survey || — || align=right | 2.6 km || 
|-id=970 bgcolor=#d6d6d6
| 485970 ||  || — || October 7, 2008 || Mount Lemmon || Mount Lemmon Survey || — || align=right | 2.9 km || 
|-id=971 bgcolor=#d6d6d6
| 485971 ||  || — || March 14, 2012 || Kitt Peak || Spacewatch || — || align=right | 2.7 km || 
|-id=972 bgcolor=#d6d6d6
| 485972 ||  || — || February 27, 2006 || Kitt Peak || Spacewatch || — || align=right | 2.8 km || 
|-id=973 bgcolor=#fefefe
| 485973 ||  || — || May 9, 2012 || Haleakala || Pan-STARRS || H || align=right data-sort-value="0.53" | 530 m || 
|-id=974 bgcolor=#fefefe
| 485974 ||  || — || June 10, 2004 || Campo Imperatore || CINEOS || H || align=right data-sort-value="0.63" | 630 m || 
|-id=975 bgcolor=#d6d6d6
| 485975 ||  || — || April 27, 2012 || Haleakala || Pan-STARRS || — || align=right | 2.7 km || 
|-id=976 bgcolor=#d6d6d6
| 485976 ||  || — || January 30, 2011 || Haleakala || Pan-STARRS || — || align=right | 2.5 km || 
|-id=977 bgcolor=#d6d6d6
| 485977 ||  || — || March 3, 2006 || Kitt Peak || Spacewatch || critical || align=right | 2.5 km || 
|-id=978 bgcolor=#d6d6d6
| 485978 ||  || — || February 25, 2010 || WISE || WISE || — || align=right | 5.3 km || 
|-id=979 bgcolor=#d6d6d6
| 485979 ||  || — || June 16, 2007 || Kitt Peak || Spacewatch || Tj (2.99) || align=right | 3.5 km || 
|-id=980 bgcolor=#fefefe
| 485980 ||  || — || November 8, 2010 || Catalina || CSS || H || align=right data-sort-value="0.64" | 640 m || 
|-id=981 bgcolor=#d6d6d6
| 485981 ||  || — || November 30, 2010 || Mount Lemmon || Mount Lemmon Survey || — || align=right | 2.4 km || 
|-id=982 bgcolor=#d6d6d6
| 485982 ||  || — || February 4, 2006 || Kitt Peak || Spacewatch || — || align=right | 2.2 km || 
|-id=983 bgcolor=#d6d6d6
| 485983 ||  || — || November 25, 2009 || Kitt Peak || Spacewatch || — || align=right | 2.8 km || 
|-id=984 bgcolor=#d6d6d6
| 485984 ||  || — || January 8, 2010 || WISE || WISE || — || align=right | 3.0 km || 
|-id=985 bgcolor=#fefefe
| 485985 ||  || — || December 25, 2005 || Kitt Peak || Spacewatch || H || align=right data-sort-value="0.71" | 710 m || 
|-id=986 bgcolor=#fefefe
| 485986 ||  || — || May 16, 2012 || Haleakala || Pan-STARRS || H || align=right data-sort-value="0.83" | 830 m || 
|-id=987 bgcolor=#d6d6d6
| 485987 ||  || — || January 28, 2011 || Mount Lemmon || Mount Lemmon Survey || — || align=right | 3.1 km || 
|-id=988 bgcolor=#fefefe
| 485988 ||  || — || February 14, 2009 || Kitt Peak || Spacewatch || H || align=right data-sort-value="0.71" | 710 m || 
|-id=989 bgcolor=#d6d6d6
| 485989 ||  || — || January 13, 2011 || Mount Lemmon || Mount Lemmon Survey || criticalTj (2.99) || align=right | 2.8 km || 
|-id=990 bgcolor=#d6d6d6
| 485990 ||  || — || April 18, 2012 || Kitt Peak || Spacewatch || — || align=right | 2.7 km || 
|-id=991 bgcolor=#d6d6d6
| 485991 ||  || — || February 4, 2011 || Haleakala || Pan-STARRS || — || align=right | 3.2 km || 
|-id=992 bgcolor=#d6d6d6
| 485992 ||  || — || November 27, 2009 || Mount Lemmon || Mount Lemmon Survey || 7:4 || align=right | 5.4 km || 
|-id=993 bgcolor=#d6d6d6
| 485993 ||  || — || November 15, 2003 || Kitt Peak || Spacewatch || — || align=right | 3.1 km || 
|-id=994 bgcolor=#d6d6d6
| 485994 ||  || — || January 9, 2011 || Mount Lemmon || Mount Lemmon Survey || — || align=right | 2.4 km || 
|-id=995 bgcolor=#d6d6d6
| 485995 ||  || — || January 30, 2011 || Haleakala || Pan-STARRS || — || align=right | 2.4 km || 
|-id=996 bgcolor=#d6d6d6
| 485996 ||  || — || January 23, 2006 || Kitt Peak || Spacewatch || — || align=right | 2.9 km || 
|-id=997 bgcolor=#fefefe
| 485997 ||  || — || March 29, 2009 || Siding Spring || SSS || H || align=right data-sort-value="0.85" | 850 m || 
|-id=998 bgcolor=#d6d6d6
| 485998 ||  || — || January 30, 2006 || Kitt Peak || Spacewatch || — || align=right | 3.0 km || 
|-id=999 bgcolor=#d6d6d6
| 485999 ||  || — || February 3, 2012 || Mount Lemmon || Mount Lemmon Survey || — || align=right | 3.1 km || 
|-id=000 bgcolor=#d6d6d6
| 486000 ||  || — || September 12, 2007 || Mount Lemmon || Mount Lemmon Survey || Tj (2.99) || align=right | 3.5 km || 
|}

References

External links 
 Discovery Circumstances: Numbered Minor Planets (485001)–(490000) (IAU Minor Planet Center)

0485